= Barrio Triste =

- Theatrical release poster
- Directed by: Stillz
- Written by: Stillz
- Produced by: James Clauer; Eric Kohn; Esteban Zuluaga
- Starring: Brahian Acevedo; Juan Pablo Baena; Samuel Andrés Celis
- Cinematography: Stillz
- Edited by: Adam Robinson
- Music by: Arca
- Production companies: EDGLRD; WeOwnTheCity
- Distributed by: Film Movement (United States); Gluon Media (Colombia)
- Release dates: September 2, 2025 (Venice); July 10, 2026 (United States)
- Running time: 89 minutes
- Countries: Colombia; United States
- Language: Spanish
- Box office: $38,398

Barrio Triste is a 2025 found footage fantasy crime drama film written and directed by Stillz. A co-production between Colombia and the United States, it follows four teenagers as they document their own rowdiness in a hauntingly poetic portrait of violence and loneliness in 1980s Medellín.

The film premiered at the Orizzonti section of the 82nd Venice International Film Festival on September 2, 2025, and it was released in the United States by Film Movement on July 10, 2026.

== Plot ==
In 1987, local residents in Medellín report strange lights descending from the sky. When a reporter arrives to investigate, a group of teens steal the camera. With it, they record their neighborhood and the disturbing phenomena that surrounds them. Led by restless youths like Caneco and Piojo, their initial fascination with the camera quickly turns into a tool for capturing the raw, neglected reality of their surroundings, blending mundane teenage boredom with an unsettling sense of looming supernatural dread.

Later, the group of teenagers — including Caneco, Piojo, Rata and Cuchilla — are seen riding inside a stolen car while listening to a radio broadcast featuring an interview about a serial killer who targets prostitutes. Driven by a lack of direction and reckless impulse, the boys pull up to a local jewelry store to execute a robbery. During the heist, one of the teens shoots and kills the cashier, plunging the group into serious trouble once they retreat back to their hideout. As chaos brews among them, Caneco paces around filming the interior of the house before smashing a stereo playing a news segment regarding the sudden disappearance of one of their close friends.

Caneco continues documenting the raw, mundane, and chaotic daily occurrences scattered across their neighborhood; a local punk rock band rehearsing, two young girls exercising, Piojo casually wielding and playing with a machete, a sugarcane cutter sternly scolding one of the boys, and a teenager getting dragged into a heated brawl with a biker. Caneco approaches the defeated teenager — who confesses to feeling suicidal — and motivates him to join their crew as they take the stolen car from the jewelry heist and set it ablaze to destroy evidence. Later that night, the group ventures into an abandoned, decaying building where they encounter the mysterious Light Child, an otherworldly figure whose touch causes each member of the group to vanish into thin air.

Upon the Light Child’s touch, Caneco finds himself abruptly transported to an abandoned swimming pool where a few members of the group are strangely seen swimming. He wanders aimlessly through the empty streets and desolate alleys of the neighborhood before heading back home. Following the eerie sound of a dog’s howl, he is led into another abandoned building where he witnesses a dark alien standing directly over the defeated teenager's disemboweled body. Overwhelmed by the cosmic horror and loss, Caneco returns home and quietly smokes a cigarette, leaving the recorded camera tape abruptly inconclusive.

Interspersed throughout the entirety of the film are raw interview tapes of Caneco, Piojo, Rata, and Cuchilla being questioned about their lives, core beliefs, and personal struggles. As these intimate sit-down sessions progress, the confident facade of the group fractures; Caneco candidly opens up about a four-year-old daughter he never knew he had, the deep neglect he suffered from his parents, and his persistent, debilitating battle with depression.

== Cast ==
- Brahian Acevedo as Caneco
- Juan Pablo Baena as Piojo
- Samuel Andrés Celis as Rata
- Tomás Tinoco Higuita as Calambre
- Estiven Salazar as Batman
- Brayan Erlín García as Apestado
- José Arley Marín González as Pocillo
- Samuel Ruiz as Cuchilla
- Samuel Velásquez as Mundomalo
- Jorge Cano as Reporter
- Begoña Lopez as Broadcast Reporter
- David Noreña as Radio Host
- Maria Cristina Pimiento as Radio Hostess
- Pedro Suárez as Interview Killer
- Joan Casas as Punk Band Guitarist
- Sarah Alejandra Maiorana Restrepo as Punk Girl
- María Fernanda Villalba as Punk Girl
- Isaac Mejía as Light Child
- David Gañan as Alien
- Luz Amparo González as Sugarcane Cutter
- Javier Hardoy as Missing Boy
- Carlos Moreno as Missing Boy
- Thomas Andrés Argel Mira as Sad Boy
- Mateo Salazar as Motorcycle Rider
- Gustavo Montoya as Jeweler

== Production ==
In August 2025, it was revealed that Colombian music video director Stillz would be making his feature narrative feature debut in a U.S.-Colombia co-produced film.

Venezuelan musician Arca composed the score, marking her first original film score. Harmony Korine served as executive producer through his EDGLRD company.

== Release ==
Barrio Triste premiered at the Orizzonti section of the 82nd Venice International Film Festival on September 2, 2025. It was also selected to the 2025 Toronto International Film Festival.

In February 2026, Film Movement acquired the North American distribution rights, scheduled to be released in the United States on July 10, 2026.

== Reception ==
On review aggregator website Rotten Tomatoes, the film holds an approval rating of 67% based on 15 reviews, with an average rating of 7.0/10. Metacritic, which uses a weighted average, assigned the film a score of 74 out of 100, based on four critics, indicating "generally favorable" reviews.
