= Eric Kohn =

American journalist

Eric Kohn is an American film journalist, educator and producer. He served as IndieWire's chief film critic from 2010 to 2021. and held several editorial and executive roles at the publication. In 2023, Kohn left IndieWire to become lead strategy and development of Harmony Korine's EDGLRD company, and in 2024 was named artistic director of the Southampton Playhouse in Southampton, New York.

Kohn has also taught as an adjunct professor at New York University since 2014, and co-founded the Critics Academy workshops at the Locarno and New York film festivals as well as the Sundance Fellowship for Film Criticism.

== Early life and education ==
Kohn was born in Houston, Texas. His mother is Gigi Yellen, a longtime Texan classical music radio DJ. The family then moved to Seattle, Washington where was raised in a traditionally Jewish household. He credits the films of Steven Spielberg with sparking an early interest in cinema, as well as Seattle's arthouse cinemas with nurturing his deeper appreciation for the form.

He studied at New York University, majoring in Cinema Studies and Journalism, and later received his master's degree in Cinema Studies there. While a student, Kohn worked as a research assistant for the film critic J. Hoberman at the Village Voice, and interned at Entertainment Weekly.

== Career ==
In 2007, Kohn began writing for IndieWire as a critic and festival reporter. He was hired by one of the site's founders, Eugene Hernandez, then the editor-in-chief, to be its chief film critic in 2010, and he held that position through 2020, when David Ehrlich took over the role. Kohn also held senior and deputy editor positions before being named the site's executive editor from 2018 to 2023, and then its vice president of editorial strategy from 2021 to 2023.

Kohn also co-hosted IndieWire's Screen Talk podcast with Anne Thompson for nearly a decade, and chaired the New York Film Critics Circle in 2018 and 2019.

In August 2023, Kohn was named the Head of Strategy and Development of EDGLRD, a Miami-based creative and technology company founded by filmmaker Harmony Korine that same year. Kohn also works across the company's film, design, games, and fashion sectors, and the company has become known for immersive film premieres at strip clubs and Boiler Room DJ sets during Miami Art Week, which Kohn told The New York Times is part of the company's approach to distribution strategies outside of typical film markets

Kohn had previously edited a collection of interviews with Korine published by University Press of Mississippi in 2014.

Baby Invasion, an experimental thriller and the first EDGLRD release on which Kohn is credited as executive producer, premiered at the 81st Venice International Film Festival. He is lead producer of Korine's upcoming film, an untitled motion capture comedy set for release in 2025

In December 2024, Kohn was appointed artistic director of the Southampton Playhouse, a single-screen cinema in Southampton, New York built in 1932 which is being repurposed as a multiple-space arthouse including the first IMAX screen in the Hamptons.

== Work in film education ==
Kohn has taught as an adjunct professor at New York University's Martin Scorsese Department of Cinema Studies, beginning with the 2014-2015 school year. He was previously responsible for its "Language of Film" core class, and continues to teach various other courses on film criticism, distribution, and industry.

He also co-founded the Critics Academy workshop at the Locarno and New York film festivals, dedicated to introducing young film writers into the industry, as well as the Sundance Fellowship for Film Criticism.
