= Tamashika =

2026 video game

- Developer: Quicktequila
- Publisher: EDGLRD
- Designer: Vidhvat Madan
- Platforms: Nintendo Switch; PlayStation 5; Windows; Xbox One; Xbox Series X/S
- Release: April 10, 2026
- Mode: Single-player

Tamashika is a first-person shooter video game developed by Indian studio Quicktequila and published by EDGLRD. EDGLRD is an American creative and technology company founded in 2023 by filmmaker Harmony Korine. It was released on April 10, 2026, for Nintendo Switch, PlayStation 5, Windows, Xbox One and Xbox Series X/S.

== Development ==
The game was revealed in 2024 as a “fast-paced arcade-style corridor shooter".

Tamashika was again reported on in March 2025, as the first video game release from Harmony Korine's EDGLRD. Korine founded EDGLRD in 2023, using the imprint to release his films Aggro Dr1ft and Baby Invasion. Tamashika was publicly playable for the first time at Day of the Devs on March 16 and the Game Developers Conference later that same month (GDC 2025).

Tamashika features hand-drawn animations. The developer has stated that the game is designed to be played in short sessions due to its daily procedurally generated level mechanics.

Developer Quicktequila was known previously for the first-person shooter games Lovely Planet and Lovely Planet 2: April Skies.

Post launch, the game was added to Xbox Game Pass and had a new mode released, titled Accelerate. The mode has the player caught in a loop on the level, and each lap increases the speed of the gameplay. Transcend mode also received updates, adding pickups, jump pads, and an in-game calendar.

== Gameplay ==
The game features a minimalist combat system in which players are limited to a single firearm and a single melee weapon. The gameplay emphasizes precision and timing.

Each day, players enter a procedurally assembled labyrinth created from roughly 300 pre-designed segments arranged in a fixed daily configuration. The resulting levels feature branching paths and enemy encounters. A global leaderboard tracks performance on the daily labyrinth, allowing players to compete under identical conditions.

== Release and reception ==
Reception

Aggregate scores
Aggregator	Score
Metacritic	(PC) 79/100
OpenCritic	40% recommend (Note: Based on 3 reviews)

Tamashika received generally favorable reviews from critics upon release, according to the review aggregation website Metacritic. Fellow review aggregator OpenCritic assessed that the game received strong approval, being recommended by 40% of critics.

In their review, ComicBook.com called the title a "strange yet alluring" shooter with "smooth, simple, and rewarding" gunplay, emphasizing instinct-driven gameplay over complexity.

Some critics questioned its value, pointing to its single procedurally reshuffled level and relatively small amount of content, though others argued that its replayability and daily variation made up for it.
