= Hope of the States =

English indie band

- Origin: Chichester, England
- Genres: Alternative rock, indie rock, post-rock, new prog
- Years active: 2000–2006, 2024-present
- Members: Sam Herlihy; Michael Hibbert; Simon Jones; James Ramsden; Michael Siddell; Paul Wilson
- Past members: James "Jimmi" Lawrence; Keith Seymour; Scott R Walker; Anthony Theaker

Hope of the States are an English post rock-influenced indie band, formed in Chichester in 2000.

Following the release of 2 albums, the band split up in 2006 before reuniting in 2024.

== History ==
The band formed in 2000, naming themselves after The Shame of the States, Albert Deutsch's 1948 book on the state of mental healthcare in the United States. They were discovered after sending a demo to the Planet Sound teletext page, and were signed to Sony BMG. The band's bass player Scott R. Walker left the band after the first initial releases and then went on to form Kasms with Rory Attwell.

The band's guitarist James "Jimmi" Lawrence died from suicide by hanging on 15 January 2004, during recording sessions for their debut album at Real World Studios in Box, Wiltshire. They then enlisted guitarist Michael Hibbert, with Herlihy stating that the guitarist had fit in "incredibly. Not just as a guitarist but in handling the situation. He plays in his own way, jumps around and that's exactly what we need. I don't want someone who's going to stand there depressed, or try to copy Jimmi".

The band released their debut album The Lost Riots on 7 June 2004, and reached the Top 40 in the UK Albums Chart. The band's first single, "Black Dollar Bills", was packaged in a hessian sleeve, each hand-sewn by a band member. The band's most extensive UK tour started in October 2004, beginning with a date in Belfast's Mandela Hall, including an appearance at the Dance Academy in Plymouth.

Much of 2005 was spent recording the follow-up to The Lost Riots, and the band only made six live appearances. The band performed some songs to be included on their second album at an acoustic performance in London. The band worked with fansite "The Halfway Home" to produce an advent calendar for Christmas 2005. The only studio recording released in 2005 was the track 'Shalom', included as Day 24 on the calendar.

In April 2006 the band released a new EP, Blood Meridian, accompanied by a low-key UK tour beginning in The Cockpit in Leeds. The EP was limited to 2,000 copies, available on vinyl, and was also available for download. The single "Sing it Out" was released in June 2006, reaching No. 39 in the UK Singles Chart, and their second album Left followed on 19 June.

The band appeared at T in the Park on 8 July, and then the Reading and Leeds Festivals in August, where they played on the BBC Radio 1/NME stage. During their set on 27 August at Reading, it emerged it may be their last ever show as the band were splitting up. This was suggested further later in the day by friends Broken Social Scene, who dedicated their festival set to the band. On 30 August, Sam Herlihy made a statement on the band's forum confirming the split and that Reading was their last show.

Following the band's split, Sam Herlihy and Simon Jones formed The Northwestern, who split in 2012. The rest of the band formed Troubles, with Michael Hibbert leaving in 2007 to form Chapel Club, who split in 2013.

On 8 July 2024, the band announced that they had reunited to play 3 gigs in December 2024 and were recording new material with producer Jolyon Thomas. A fourth date was added following strong ticket sales.

"Long Waits in A&E", the band's first new song since 2006, was released to digital and streaming platforms on 1 November 2024. A single-sided vinyl release, limited to 1,000 copies, was sold at the band's comeback gigs in December 2024.

This was followed by the release of The Magic Kingdom (B-sides 2002-2006) to digital and streaming platforms on 17 December 2024. The compilation features all the B-sides from the band's single releases from "Black Dollar Bills" to "Left", including several which had not previously been available on streaming services.

Further activity followed in 2025 with the release of "Lonesome Tear Gas Country" (from the upcoming Dust Rackets 7) via social media and YouTube in June, followed by the single "Footage/Steamtrain", released digitally on 15 July 2025. This coincided with the announcement of a three-date tour in October 2025, with a further new song "Billboard Mountain" being released digitally on 13 October 2025, the eve of the tour.

== Members ==
- Sam Herlihy – vocals, guitar, piano, music boxes, glockenspiels, mellotron, sampler, celeste, harmonium,
- Michael Hibbert – guitar, harmonica, backing vocals
- Simon Jones – drums, percussion, glockenspiel, backing vocals
- James Ramsden - guitar, piano
- Mike Siddell – violin, farfisa, glockenspiel, backing vocals
- Paul Wilson – bass guitar, backing vocals

=== Former members ===
- James "Jimmi" Lawrence – guitar
- Keith Seymour – bass guitar
- Scott R Walker – bass guitar
- Anthony Theaker – guitar, piano, hammond organ, farfisa, celeste, laptop, music box, moog synthesizer, glockenspiel, mellotron

== Discography ==
=== Studio albums ===
List of albums, with selected chart positions
Title	Album details	Peak chart positions	
Title	Album details	UK	SCO
The Lost Riots	Released: 7 June 2004; Label: Sony Music UK; Formats: CD, DL	21	21
Left	Released: 19 June 2006; Label: Columbia; Formats: CD, DL	50	51

=== Compilation album ===
Title	Album details
The Magic Kingdom (B-sides 2002-2006)	Released: 17 December 2024; Label: Sony Music UK; Formats: DL

=== Extended plays ===
Title	Album details
Winter Riot Dust Rackets	Released: 19 August 2004; Label: Epic; Formats: CD, DL
Blood Meridian	Released: 3 April 2006; Label: Sony BMG; Formats: CD, DL, LP

=== Singles ===
Title	Year	Peak chart positions				Album
Title	Year	UK	UK Indie	UK Rock	SCO	Album
"Black Dollar Bills"	2002	83	10	—	93	The Lost Riots
"Enemies/Friends"	2003	25	—	—	31	The Lost Riots
"The Red the White the Black the Blue"	2004	15	—	—	22	The Lost Riots
"Nehemiah"	2004	30	—	2	29	The Lost Riots
"Sing It Out"	2006	39	—	—	28	Left
"Left"	2006	63	—	—	30	Left
"Long Waits in A&E"	2024	—	—	—	—	Non-album singles
"Footage/Steamtrain"	2025	—	—	—	—	Non-album singles
"Billboard Mountain"	2025	—	—	—	—	Non-album singles

=== Demos and promotional singles ===
- Untitled 8-track demo (CDR; not 9 tracks, as some sources suggest)
- Untitled 2-track demo (Black Dollar Bills/Three Days In The West; CDR)
- Untitled "Fingerprints" demo (CD limited to 10 copies)
- "AMM=IBM" (MP3 download)
- "L'Ark Pour Les Enfants Terribles" (October 2004; ltd. tour CD)

== See also ==
- The Northwestern (band)
