= The Lost Riots =

Studio album by Hope of the States
- Released: 7 June 2004
- Recorded: 2003–2004
- Studio: Jacobs Studios, Farnham; Grouse Lodge Studios, Rosemount, County Westmeath; Real World Studios, Bath
- Genre: Indie rock; post-rock
- Length: 66:09
- Label: Sony Music UK
- Producer: Ken Thomas

Hope of the States chronology
| The Lost Riots (2004) | Left (2006) |

Singles from The Lost Riots
- 1. "Black Dollar Bills" Released: 3 March 2003; 2. "Enemies/Friends" Released: 29 September 2003; 3. "The Red the White the Black the Blue" Released: 24 May 2004; 4. "Nehemiah" Released: 16 August 2004

Professional ratings
Aggregate scores
| Source | Rating |
|---|---|
| Metacritic | 69/100 |
Review scores
| Source | Rating |
| AllMusic | 4.5/5 stars |
| Drowned in Sound | 8/10 |
| The Guardian | 2/5 stars |
| NME | 9/10 |
| Pitchfork | 5.7/10 |

The Lost Riots is the debut album by Chichester-based rock band Hope of the States, released on 7 June 2004 in the United Kingdom, on 1 September 2004 in Japan, and on 5 October 2004 in the United States. The album was recorded at studios in Ireland and England, and thought to be recorded partly in Russia, before the finishing touches were put together at Real World Studios in Bath. Guitarist James "Jimmi" Lawrence committed suicide during the mixing of the album in January 2004.

The Lost Riots was bolstered by the release of several singles: "Black Dollar Bills" in March 2003 and "Enemies/Friends" in September 2003, which peaked at numbers 83 and 25, respectively, on the UK Singles Chart, while "The Red the White the Black the Blue" gave the band their highest-charting single when it peaked at number 15 in the UK and number 22 in Scotland upon release in May 2004. A fourth single, "Nehemiah", was released in August 2004 and peaked at number 30 in the UK. All four singles were accompanied by promotional music videos, directed by creative design collective Type2error.

Released to mostly enthusiastic critical acclaim upon release, reviewers praised the band's balance of intense post-rock bombast and anthemic post-Britpop dynamics, while criticism was directed at lead singer Samuel Herlihy's lack of vocal range and the band's dour sound. The album charted at number 21 on the UK Albums Chart.

== Track listing ==
All tracks are written by Hope of the States (Samuel Herlihy, Simon Jones, James Lawrence, Michael Siddell, Anthony Theaker and Paul Wilson)

| No. | Title | Length |
|---|---|---|
| 1. | "The Black Amnesias" | 4:40 |
| 2. | "Enemies/Friends" | 4:41 |
| 3. | "66 Sleepers to Summer" | 5:00 |
| 4. | "Don't Go to Pieces" | 4:47 |
| 5. | "The Red the White the Black the Blue" | 3:40 |
| 6. | "Black Dollar Bills" | 6:54 |
| 7. | "George Washington" | 3:26 |
| 8. | "Me Ves y Sufres" | 5:33 |
| 9. | "Sadness on My Back" | 3:58 |
| 10. | "Nehemiah" | 4:09 |
| 11. | "Goodhorsehymn" | 3:53 |
| 12. | "1776" | 5:06 |
| 13. | "A Crack-Up at the Race Riots" (hidden track) | 4:47 |

After "1776" ends and a period of roughly five minutes of silence, the hidden track "A Crack-Up at the Race Riots" can be found. The name of the song is based on a book by Harmony Korine, and for legal reasons, the band couldn't include it as a proper track. The total length of track 12 with both songs and silence is 14:53.

Japanese CD bonus tracks
| No. | Title | Length |
|---|---|---|
| 13. | "The Workmiser Harmonies" | 4:33 |
| 14. | "Angels Over Kilburn" | 7:30 |
| 15. | "A Crack-Up at the Race Riots" (hidden track) | 4:47 |

The total length for track 14 on the Japanese CD release is 17:18.

== Personnel ==
Adapted from the liner notes of the CD.

Hope of the States

- Samuel Herlihy – vocals, guitars, piano, vibes, percussion
- Anthony Theaker – guitars, organ, percussion
- James Lawrence – electric guitar
- Paul Wilson – bass
- Michael Siddell – violin
- Simon Jones – drums, percussion

Additional musicians

- Joe Auckland – trumpet on "The Black Amnesias"
- Richard George – violin on "Enemies/Friends", "Me Ves y Sufres", "Sadness on My Back" and "1776"
- Reiad Chibah – viola on "Enemies/Friends", "Me Ves y Sufres", "Sadness on My Back" and "1776"
- Chris Worsey – cello on "Enemies/Friends", "Me Ves y Sufres", "Sadness on My Back" and "1776"
- Millennia Strings – additional strings on "Enemies/Friends", "Me Ves y Sufres", "Sadness on My Back" and "1776"
- Kenneth Rice – additional strings on "Don't Go to Pieces" and "George Washington"
- Una O'Kane – additional strings on "Don't Go to Pieces" and "George Washington"
- Neil Martin – additional strings on "George Washington"
- Amy Little – cello on "Goodhorsehymn"
- Helen Tunstall – harp on "1776"

Production

- Ken Thomas – producer, mixing
- Jack Clark – recording engineer, mixing engineer
- Adam Noble – assistant engineer
- Jon Bailey – assistant engineer
- Steve Orchard – assistant engineer
- Louis Read – assistant engineer
- Claire Lewis – assistant engineer
- Rowen Rossiter – assistant engineer
- James Loughry – additional vocal recording
- Tim Young – mastering

Design

- Type2error – design and packaging concept
- Hope of the States – design and packaging concept
- Joel Clifford – anatomical illustrations
