= Philadelphia State Hospital at Byberry =

Coordinates: 40.1193°N 74.9870°W

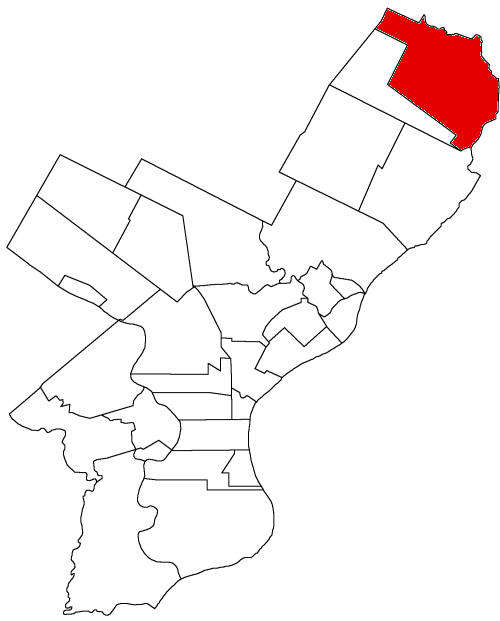

Geography
- Location: Philadelphia, Pennsylvania, United States

Organization
- Type: Specialist

Services
- Beds: 7,000
- Speciality: Psychiatric hospital

History
- Former names: Philadelphia State Hospital, Byberry State Hospital, Byberry City Farms, Philadelphia Hospital for Mental Diseases
- Constructed: 1906
- Opened: 1907
- Closed: June 1990
- Demolished: 14 June 2006

Links
- Lists: Hospitals in Pennsylvania

The Philadelphia State Hospital at Byberry was a psychiatric hospital located on either side of Roosevelt Boulevard, US Route 1, in Northeast Philadelphia, Pennsylvania. It was located in the Somerton section of the city on the border with Bucks County. The name of the institution was changed several times during its history, being variously named Philadelphia State Hospital, Byberry State Hospital, Byberry City Farms, and the Philadelphia Hospital for Mental Diseases. It was home to people ranging from mentally challenged, to criminally insane.

The primary buildings were constructed between 1907 and the mid-1920s. Newer buildings were constructed between 1940 and 1953. The facility included over fifty buildings such as male and female dormitories, an infirmary, kitchens, laundry, administration, a chapel, and a morgue. The hospital's population grew rapidly, quickly exceeding its capacity. The peak patient population was over 7,000 in 1960.

Several investigations into the conditions at the hospital at various points revealed that raw sewage lined the hallways, patients slept in the halls, and the staff mistreated and exploited patients.

== History ==
The institution began as a small work farm for the mentally ill. Soon, plans were made to turn the farm into a cottage plan asylum. Construction began on the institution in 1906. It was established in 1907 as the Byberry Mental Hospital.

It originally followed the theory of physician Benjamin Rush that mental illness was a disease and could be cured with proper treatment, but that the mentally diseased should be kept away from normal people until they were actually cured. Many of the original patients were transferred from Philadelphia General Hospital, which closed in 1977. All personnel were sent to other hospitals, and patients sent to Norristown State Hospital.

== State operation ==
The hospital was turned over to the state in 1936 and was renamed the Philadelphia State Hospital at Byberry. Conditions in the hospital during this time were poor, with allegations of patient abuse and inhumane treatment frequently made. The situation came to national attention between 1945 and 1946, when conscientious objector Charlie Lord took covert photos of the institution and the conditions inside, while serving there as an orderly.

The 36 black-and-white photos documented issues including dozens of naked men huddling together and human excrement lining facility hallways. The photos were shown to a number of people, including then-First Lady Eleanor Roosevelt, who subsequently pledged her support in pursuing national mental health reforms. In May 1946, Lord's photos were published in an issue of Life, creating a national "mass uproar".

In his 1948 book, The Shame of the States, Albert Deutsch described the horrid conditions he observed:

"As I passed through some of Byberry's wards, I was reminded of the pictures of the Nazi concentration camps. I entered a building swarming with naked humans herded like cattle and treated with less concern, pervaded by a fetid odor so heavy, so nauseating, that the stench seemed to have almost a physical existence of its own."

During the 1960s, the hospital began a continuous downsizing that would end with its closure. During the mid-1980s, the hospital came under scrutiny when it was learned that violent criminals were being kept on the hospital's Forensic Ward (N8-2A). In 1985, the hospital failed a state inspection, and was accused of misleading the inspection team.

Reports of patient abuse were still rampant through the 1980s. One patient had reported that one of his teeth was pulled without "Novocaine". Another state inspection team was sent to evaluate the hospital in early 1987. By the summer of 1987, five of the Philadelphia State Hospital's top officials were promptly fired after the Byberry facility once again failed the state inspection.

== Closing and abandonment ==
On December 7, 1987, a press conference was held to announce the closure of the Philadelphia State Hospital at Byberry.

The teams most recently performing investigations described the conditions as "atrocious" and "irreversible". Though originally supposed to close in 1988, patient issues delayed the process. Most importantly, two released patients were found dead in the Delaware River in two successive days after their release. The hospital officially closed in June 1990, with the remaining patients and staff transferred to Norristown State Hospital or local community centers.

== Period of abandonment 1990–2006 ==
The buildings were not demolished at first because of asbestos poisoning concerns. Looters broke in several weeks after the closing and began to steal everything of value, especially copper piping and wiring. After the looters had removed everything of value, vandals trespassed on the grounds, smashed windows, and started fires.

Urban explorers wandered the halls and the extensive underground network that connected each building though tunnel corridors. By 2000, Byberry saw an explosion of people visiting the abandoned hospital. The internet offered extremely exaggerated stories and legends, as well as tips on gaining access to the abandoned buildings while avoiding police and security. Satanists held ceremonies on the grounds, and amid reports of dead animals being found, the police were frequent visitors.

By 2003, the Philadelphia State Hospital at Byberry site was a complete and utter ruin. Graffiti covered every buildings exterior and interior, every window was smashed, and anything flammable remaining when the hospital closed was in ashes. The residents of Somerton were now pressuring the City of Philadelphia to end the "Byberry Problem" once and for all. The city responded by sealing the buildings up with plywood and changing security contractors. The boarded windows made it easier for trespassers to conceal themselves.

== Demolition ==
Westrum Development purchased the property and hired Geppert Bros. Inc. to demolish the buildings. Delta B.J.D.S. Inc. was hired to remove hazardous materials such as lead paint, and asbestos. Abatement and demolition started with the "C" buildings, followed by the "W" buildings, and ended with the "N" buildings.

On June 14, 2006, a ceremony was held to celebrate the complete demolition of the former Byberry hospital, and the future construction by Westrum Development of "The Arbours at Eagle Pointe" a 332-unit active adult club house community, featuring single homes, town, and carriage homes.

== Notable individuals ==
- James Benjamin Parker, African-American who attempted to stop the assassination of president William McKinley

== Media ==
The hospital has been featured in the paranormal television series Scared!. The Byberry facility is a featured location in the Haunted Philadelphia pop-up books series by photographer Colette Fu.
