= Haunted Collector =

American TV series

- Genre: Paranormal; Documentary
- Created by: John Zaffis
- Presented by: John Zaffis
- Starring: John Zaffis; Chris Zaffis; Aimee Zaffis; Brian Cano; Beth Ezzo (Season 1); Jason Gates (Seasons 2,3); Jesslyn Brown (Seasons 2,3)
- Country of origin: United States
- Original language: English
- No. of seasons: 3
- No. of episodes: 30

Production
- Executive producers: Scott Gurney; Deirdre Gurney; Rick Sasson; Rick Telles
- Production location: United States
- Cinematography: David Lane
- Editors: Megan Carson; Mimi Snow; Carey Williams
- Running time: 45 minutes
- Production company: Gurney Productions

Original release
- Network: Syfy
- Release: June 1, 2011 – May 10, 2013

Haunted Collector is an American television reality series that aired on the Syfy cable television channel. The first season premiered on June 1, 2011, and ended on July 6, 2011. The series features a team of paranormal investigators led by demonologist John Zaffis, who investigate alleged haunted locations with the hopes of identifying and removing any on-site artifacts or trigger objects that may be the source of the supposed paranormal or poltergeist activity.

The production of the second season started in December 2011 and premiered on June 6, 2012.

On September 17, 2012, Syfy announced that the series was renewed for 12-episode third season, which premiered on March 6, 2013.

On November 8, 2013, Syfy announced that it had cancelled Haunted Collector.

The series was rebroadcast under the name The Haunted Collector Files on Travel Channel in 2021.

== Plot ==
Demonologist John Zaffis and his family investigate the sites of alleged paranormal occurrences. The Zaffis family and their team travel around the world to investigate items that Zaffis identifies as having something to do with spirits or energies. Zaffis removes the items from the location and takes them to his haunted relics museum in a barn on his property in Stratford, Connecticut.

== Broadcast ==
The programme broadcast on Syfy in the United States and Really in the United Kingdom.

== Summary ==
According to Zaffis, an artifact itself may either be of a paranormal nature such as a religious object once used in occult rituals or a non-paranormal nature such as an antique purchased at an estate sale or garage sale. Once an artifact is deemed to be a possible source of paranormal activity, it is removed from the premises in hopes that the activity in the location being investigated will be mitigated or cease altogether. The artifact is then housed in John Zaffis' paranormal artifact museum.

== Cast and crew ==
- John Zaffis - team leader, owner of Zaffis Paranormal Museum in Stratford, Connecticut
- Chris Zaffis - paranormal investigator
- Aimee Zaffis - historical researcher
- Brian Cano - equipment technician
- Beth Ezzo - lead investigator/sensitive (Season 1)
- Jason Gates - paranormal investigator/historical researcher (Season 2 - Season 3)
- Jesslyn Brown - investigator (Season 2 - Season 3)

== Episode structure ==
- Client tour: John and Aimee walk-through with the client through their home finding possible haunted items.
- Phase 1 - daytime sweep: Brian, Chris, and Jason set up the equipment and go through home doing EMF sweeps.
- Historical research: Aimee and Jason go to the local library to dig up any historical information on the location.
- Phase 2 - nighttime investigation: The whole team (minus Aimee) investigates entire location at night using night vision.
- Item research: John brings the item he believes is haunted to an expert depending on what type of item it is and finds out more information about it.
- Final client meeting: John tells the client about the findings on their investigation and asks if they would like the haunted item removed.
- Placing haunted item in paranormal museum: John removes the haunted item and stores it in his "paranormal museum".
- Client follow-up (not aired): A voice-over of John tells the viewers about how the client is doing without the haunted item in their possession after a few weeks or months.

== Episodes ==
=== Season 1 (2011) ===
No.	Title	Haunted item(s)	Original release date
1	"Haunted Bayou/Library Ghost"	Case 1: Webley & Scott Mark III English Revolver; Case 2: 1914 Royal Typewriter	March 31, 2011
In the series premiere, John Zaffis and his paranormal team travel to Lake Charles, Louisiana, to help a woman locate objects in her house that they feel are haunted or might have "energy" attached to them. After digging in the basement crawl space, they find an old revolver that John suggests may have been used in a local bank robbery in 1961. Then they head to Deep River Public Library in Deep River, Connecticut, where a female figure thought to be Julia Spencer, the wife of original owner Richard P. Spencer, has reportedly been seen among the book shelves.
2	"My Mother's Ghost/Paranormal Predator"	Case 1: The San Francisco Music Box Company burl wood music box Case 2: Mako shark jaw bones/ cane gun	April 14, 2011
Zaffis and his team go to Pomona, California, where a woman is worried about paranormal phenomena in her house affecting her infant son. Then they investigate the claims of a shark hunter and his son being harmed in their own home in La Mirada, California. They believe it's because of an old French .410 shot gun cane gun the owner bought in a swap meet in Brooklyn, New York, where a man committed murder with it in the 1870s.
3	"Burning Spirits/Ghosts of the West"	Case 1: 1920s Japanese miners dynamite wooden blasting box Case 2: 1870s bullets lodged into a wood ceiling	April 28, 2011
The team heads to the former mining town of Sandia Park, New Mexico, near Tijeras, to investigate claims of a haunted bar called the Backside Ale House, where many Native American artifacts adorn the walls, a fireplace is constantly burning, and a smell of gas permeates. Then it's off to the Old West town of Cimarron, New Mexico, to the historic 1872 St. James Hotel, where it is claimed that guests leave in the middle of the night after being frightened by the ghost of T. J. Wright, a cowboy who was shot to death in his room. The hotel was infamous for its guests (Jesse James, Annie Oakley, and Buffalo Bill Cody), the 26 people who were killed in the saloon, and its 400 bullet holes in the three-inch wood ceiling.
4	"The Sanitarium/Firehouse Phantom"	Case 1: Poison bottle/Owner's property Case 2: Victorian mourning brooch	May 11, 2011
The team investigates a house in their hometown of Stratford, Connecticut, where a ghost girl without feet is allegedly seen floating from room to room. The team examines some of the items the previous owner left behind such as an antique billiards set and a statue of the owner's father made in Central American country of Belize. They also find an old poison bottle in the basement crawlspace. The team believes the hauntings may be caused by the owner's property because it once belonged to the Rutherford Hall Sanitarium. Then it's off to Hose Co. 3 Fire Museum in Pueblo, Colorado, built in 1895, where it's claimed that old fire vehicles drive off on their own and several deaths occurred. The team discovers a Victorian mourning brooch made out of human hair locked in a forgotten cabinet.
5	"Uncivil Spirit/Revolutionary Ghost"	Case 1: Civil War soldier's cartridge bag rivet & breastplate and a .58 caliber Minie ball Case 2: Owner's 21-year-old son/property	May 18, 2011
The team examines a Civil War-era "pain bullet" found in the backyard that they believe may be causing paranormal activity in a house in Sharpsburg, Maryland. Then they travel to River Vale, New Jersey, site of the Baylor Massacre, where a 21-year-old college student believes he is the victim of the malevolent spirit of a British American Revolutionary War soldier who keeps pinning him down to the bed while he sleeps. They also believe the owner's wood carved statue from the Bahamas may cause hauntings since the practice of obeah is steeped in sorcery and folk magic.
6	"Slaughterhouse Ghosts/Supernatural Sword"	Case 1: Foster Bros. skinning knife from the mid-1870s to World War I Case 2: Sword of Saint John the Baptist & Late 1890s Execution sword	May 25, 2011
The team investigates a 200-year-old barn in Fairfield, Connecticut, which they learn was used as a slaughter house in the early 1900s by a Hungarian family. The team speculates the barn's history is the cause of the owner's horse constantly being scratched. Later, they travel to a private house in Jacksonville, North Carolina, where it's claimed that a malevolent force led a married couple to separation when the husband became possessed by black magic. After lifting the carpet in his bedroom, the team finds a Cross of Salem symbol painted in what they say is blood, which they feel could be the cause of his blackouts.

=== Season 2 (2012) ===
No.	Title	Haunted item(s)	Original release date
7	"Haunted Mansion/Ghost Mill"	Case 1: Young girl's vertebrae bone Case 2: 1940s worker's lunch box/Native American scalping knife from the War of 1812	January 11, 2012
In the second-season premiere, John Zaffis and his paranormal team travel to a 200-year-old mansion in Warsaw, Kentucky, to investigate what the residents say is an eerie presence of a little girl. Through research, they discover that in 1868 two steamboats (The American and The United States) collided with each other on the Ohio River just across from the home, which they feel may be the cause of all the activity. Later, the team tries to find supernatural evidence inside an abandoned grain mill in Huron, Ohio, 48 hours before it is to be demolished. They learn that the mill had many work-related accidents, including an inspector who fell to her death from the 9th-floor elevator shaft and a worker who was buried alive in concrete in one of the silos.
8	"Haunted Inn/Long Live the Kings"	Case 1: Garrote made with wooden keg taps and piano wire Case 2: Antique love locket	January 25, 2012
The team investigates the Hulbert House, a 200-year-old bed-and-breakfast in Boonville, New York, where organized crime, gambling, and prostitution reportedly occurred during Prohibition. People claim to have seen the ghosts of a colonial woman and a little girl in the basement. Also, a male guest staying in Room 10 on the third floor is alleged to have disappeared in the 1970s. Later, the team investigates the 1881 King House in Mayport Village, Florida, where a relative of John King was brutally murdered with a pitchfork while sitting in a rocking chair. The current owners say they have been touched by an "unseen force", heard voices, and saw a "lady in white" by the rocker.
9	"Haunted Villa/Spirit Springs"	Case 1: Late-1700s engraved pocket watch Case 2: Native American fetish doll (with porcupine quills)	February 1, 2012
The team investigates claims of paranormal activity at a colonial villa turned restaurant built in the late 1700s (Silvio's Italian Villa) in Warwick, New York, that first belonged to Martha Ellis who found out after 45 years of marriage that her husband Levi was an adulterer and got a divorce with a big trial in 1837. The villa then belonged to Roy Vail, a gunsmith who, after his wife Edith died of a heart attack, committed suicide in what is now one of the dining rooms of the restaurant. Later, the team travels to Stephenson, Virginia, to investigate Historic Jordan Springs, a natural spring with claims of a shadowy figure of a monk in the building that once housed a Civil War hospital and a monastery.
10	"Priest Gun/Haunted Asylum"	Case 1: Gold-inlaid dentistry bridge Case 2: Volt Amp Box electro shock device with electrodes	February 8, 2012
The team investigates paranormal claims of a shadowy figure at a former antique dealer's haunted house in Sawyer, Michigan. They learn that since the house is close to Lake Michigan, there were many missing person reports and bodies washed up on the beach. Next, the team investigates the St. Alban's Asylum, a former mental health sanatorium built in 1892 in Radford, Virginia that supposedly performed lobotomies and electric shock treatments on their patients against their will.
11	"Haunted Rectory/Grand Midway Ghosts"	Case 1: Wooden tool handle used as a breakstick in dog fighting Case 2: Autolite-brand 1900s coal miner's methane gas head lamp	February 15, 2012
The team investigates alongside a dog who is allegedly "paranormally trained" at the old, historically registered Sedamsville Rectory in Cincinnati, Ohio, that's supposedly haunted by the ghost of a cloaked priest who was murdered there in the late 1800s. However, the team discovers the rectory was a part of a local dog-fighting ring. Then the team investigates paranormal claims of whispers, shadow figures and poltergeist activity at the former Grand Midway Hotel now serving as a personal residence in Windber, Pennsylvania, a former coal mining town around the start of the 20th century.
12	"Stirring the Dead/Ghost Writer"	Case 1: Mid-to-late-1800s brass screw-top lid compass and old leather boot Case 2: Inconclusive (no items were determined haunted)	February 22, 2012
The team investigates a newly renovated home from the 1800s in Lorain County, Ohio, where the basement is full of old objects from decades past. Also it is claimed that a dark shadow figure believed to be the former owner's son Malcolm Holiday, who was killed by a train on the nearby tracks in 1902, is haunting the halls. Next, the team heads to Tipp City, Ohio, to investigate Browse Awhile Books, a book store built as a barbershop in 1871 where they believe the spirit of a little child who died in a fire here may be the cause of paranormal activity.
13	"Casino Phantom/California Nightmare"	Case 1: 1890s Wizard hand-mucking card-cheating device Case 2: Inconclusive (no items determined to be haunted)	March 7, 2012
The team checks out paranormal claims that employees are being grabbed by an unseen force at Binion's Hotel and Casino in Las Vegas, Nevada, once run by illegal offshore gambler Anthony Cornero (a.k.a. Tony Stralla) in the 1940s. Next, the team heads to Glendora, California, where they investigate a law enforcement officer's 10-acre property home where he says weird knocking sounds and dark shadows terrify him and his family. Through research, it is learned that the house first belonged to a wealthy family who threw lavish parties in the 1940s and left it abandoned. Then in the 1980s, the home became a halfway house for criminals and drug addicts.
14	"Bare Bones/Octagon Haunting"	Case 1: Mid-1800s metal leeching jar Case 2: Portrait of founder Elizabeth Akers Caldwell	March 14, 2012
The team helps a family who found bones in the walls of their home that was built in the 1820s in the village of Forestville, New York. The house sits right next to the 188-year-old pioneer cemetery which the team also investigates. Through research, it is learned that the Reverend James Bennett bought the house in 1865 and his son Jerome died from tuberculosis in the home; both are buried in the cemetery. Next, the team travels to Franklin, Kentucky, to investigate Octagon Hall, an eight-sided plantation house museum used as a hospital during the American Civil War. The house was built in 1847 by Andrew Jackson Caldwell, and his daughter Mary Elizabeth is believed to haunt the place where she burned to death while playing in the kitchen fireplace.
15	"Ghost Tavern/Terror House"	Case 1: Late-1700s metal baby rattle/teething ring Case 2: Late-1800s to early-1900s ice pick	March 21, 2012
The team investigate claims of a phantom baby's cries at King's Tavern in Natchez, Mississippi, located at the end of Natchez Trace Parkway, a rugged trail that is said to have been popular with highwaymen and bandits. Next, they investigate the claims of paranormal activity at a woman's 114-year-old haunted house in Schuyler Lake, New York. Upon research, they learn that the house's original owner, Englishman Robert Jones (the acting town doctor), allegedly failed to treat a resident named Paul who was stabbed with an ice pick in front of the house in 1915.
16	"Firestarter/Haunted Museum"	Case 1: Broken Ouija board Case 2: 1806 slave tag worn in Charleston, South Carolina, and Klansman robe from a Ku Klux Klan chapter based in West Virginia	March 28, 2012
The team head to Ansonia, Connecticut, to investigate a home that a mother and children say is prone to spontaneous fires, a dark figure and a little imp-like apparition with red eyes. Next, they investigate the Hardin County History Museum in Elizabethtown, Kentucky, where people report a ghost of a man in a brown suit they believe to be a man named Christopher Frays who used to live next door during the Civil War period.
17	"Enfield Horror/Masonic Spirits"	Case 1: Early 1900s hand-carved bone Italian horn cornicello Case 2: Civil War-era three-bladed fleam	April 4, 2012
The team heads to Enfield, Connecticut, to investigate the house of a family who claim to have been plagued by malevolent paranormal activity for five years. The family says they heard a voice on a baby monitor say "You are all going to die." The team says that in 1930, an Italian immigrant named Charles Comparetto, who lived in the house, became infatuated with his neighbor, stabbed her seven times, shot her husband, and then shot himself in the home, leaving his body's blood stain on the living room floor. Then they return to Elizabethtown, Kentucky, to visit the Morrison Masonic lodge that was chartered in 1823 and was once used as a Civil War hospital during Confederate General John Hunt Morgan's campaign that took many civilian lives.
18	"Haunted Island/Ghosts of Maui"	Case 1: Early-1930s woman's metal bedframe with tealeaf design Case 2: 1923 16mm color reversal film (with footage of an unknown actress) and tin reel case	April 11, 2012
The team travels to Hawaii to investigate claims of paranormal activity on the remote island of Lanai at two executive homes (carriage house and social hall) from the old pineapple plantation in the 1920s, now a part of the corporate event space real-estate company Castle & Cooke, Inc. They say that legendary ghosts of ancient Hawaiian warriors called "Night Marchers" may be the cause. Next, they investigate the hauntings at the historic ʻIao Theater on the island of Maui where a ghost of a woman (believed to be an unknown actress) is said to be seen flying around the building. They learn that the theater sits at the base of the sacred ʻĪao Valley that was taken by Kamehameha I in a bloody battle with Hawaiian warriors.

=== Season 3 (2013) ===
No.	Title	Haunted item(s)	Original release date
19	"Farm Stalker/Echo Club Spirits"	Case 1: Leyden jar Case 2: Early-20th century account ledger and club membership photograph	February 22, 2013
First the Haunted Collector team travels to Montgomery, New York, to meet a frightened owner of Highland horse farm who believes the previous owner who died on the property is hurting her horses. Next, they head to Niagara Falls, New York, to investigate the Echo Club, a Polish-American club that was built in 1885 where the members say they are being terrorized by a malevolent entity.
20	"Cigar Bar Spirits/Child's Play"	Case 1: 1870s-era syringes in velvet case Case 2: Late-19th century pewter casket plate	March 1, 2013
The team travels to the North End in Boston, Massachusetts, to meet the owner of an Italian café, Caffe Vittoria, and a cigar bar, Stanza dei Sigari, both built in the late 1800s. Paranormal claims include a black shadowy figure that frightens his staff and customers. They discover the cigar bar used to be a baby farm in 1879 run by a Miss Elwood, who poisoned the babies with arsenic. Next, they head to Wappingers Falls, New York, to investigate claims of a ghost named Lucy D. Perrin in an 1870 Victorian house which burned down and was rebuilt two years later by the prominent Van Wyck family.
21	"Ghost Behind Bars/Haunted Brothel"	Case 1: Photograph of Lucy; Case 2: Late-1800s to early-1900s laudanum bottle	March 8, 2013
The team travels to Deer Lodge, Montana, to investigate the old Montana State Prison, built in 1908, which held several women prisoners. Staff and visitors say they see a shadowy figure of a female inmate named Lucy Cornforth who was sentenced to life in prison for accidentally poisoning her 8-year-old daughter named Mary Jane. Next, they head to Butte, Montana, to meet the owner of the former Dumas Brothel from the 1890s, who has plans to renovate it into a hotel. They learn about Sarah, a prostitute who may have fallen in love with a miner named James only to commit suicide after she learned he was killed in a copper mine explosion.
22	"Island Of Fear/tropical Terror"	Case 1: Ancient Puerto Rican ceremony stone Case 2: Native witchcraft/santeria (coconut filled with hair and a chicken tongue to make people nervous)	March 15, 2013
The team travels to the tropical island of Puerto Rico to investigate Casa Blanca (also known as the Ponce de Leon estate) in San Juan. Built in 1521, it was the former home of Ponce de Leon and his family, who spent 200 years there. Today, it is a museum and the staff claim paranormal activity such as doors slamming on their own and shadow figures. Next, they investigate a family that claims physical and auditory disturbances in their residence in Guayama, Puerto Rico.
23	"Haunted Emmitt House Ghosts/Shadow Intruder"	Case 1: Early to mid-1800s handmade veil/Patch box ("Long May You Live & Be Happy"); Case 2: Early 1900s The Great Wallace Brother Circus token (jester symbol)	March 22, 2013
The team travels to Waverly, Ohio, to investigate the haunted Emmitt House which was built as a hotel in 1861 by the prominent entrepreneur James Emmitt on the Erie Canal. Through research they learn that Emmitt lost two children; his 6-month-old son and Elizabeth, his 4-year-old daughter, from a smallpox epidemic. Next, they head to Brighton, Michigan, to investigate a private residence where a homeowner and his mother are being plagued by unsettling events and physical attacks.
24	"Spirits of Gettysburg/Headless Horseman"	Case 1: 1784 Antique Bramah Key (pick-proof key); Case 2: Union Army staff lieutenant colonel shoulder board	March 29, 2013
The team travels to Gettysburg, Pennsylvania, the site of one of the bloodiest Civil War battles, to investigate a bed and breakfast called The Inn at Herr Ridge after the manager claims to have seen the ghosts of David Lewis and Joseph Connelly walking through walls and forks and knives found embedded in the floor. Next, they head to Winfield, West Virginia, to investigate the historic Bowyer House built in 1841 and the surrounding area which includes reports of a headless horseman riding through the area at night. He is believed to be Lt. Col. Julius Garesché (mispronounced as "Julian Garesh"), who was beheaded by a cannonball during the Battle of Stones River in Tennessee. Lt. Col. Garesché accompanied "Old Rosie" (Major General William S. Rosecrans) (mispronounced as "William Rosencrans"), who owned coal mines in West Virginia.
25	"Ghosts of Geneva/Fort Fear"	Case 1: Engraving stone ("Thomas 1779"); Case 2: 1950-60s Roofing spikes (used as a safety feature on boots or shoes)	April 6, 2013
The team travels to Geneva, New York, to investigate a grandmother and her granddaughter who say they are getting pushed and scratched in their home. They claim the house is haunted by a 4-year-old white child named Thomas Mackin who died of smallpox. They also investigate the Old Wayne County Jail where William Fee was hanged for murdering a woman. Next, The team travels to Detroit, Michigan, where they investigate Fort Wayne where it is claimed a local roofer was killed by the U.S. National Guard who thought he was a sniper during the Detroit Riot of 1967.
26	"Shadow Boxer/Ghost Storm "	Case 1: WWII Smelling Salts & 1930s/1940s Phenobarbital medicine bottle (for seizures); Case 2: Inconclusive (no items determined to be haunted)	April 13, 2013
The team travels to Kansas City, Missouri to investigate claims of two little girl ghosts who are frightening the children of Whosoever Community Center which used to be schoolhouse in 1889. They learn that the building housed boxing programs throughout the years and an amateur boxer named Anthony "Tex" Johnston who had epilepsy. He's 22 years old and had died in the bathtub in his hotel room after losing a match. Next, they head to Joplin, Missouri, to investigate a private residence where a man who died after being impaled during the tornado of May 22, 2011, is contacting the family with messages of the number "22" through a 19th-century mirror above the staircase.
27	"Lakeside Terror/Pythian Secrets"	Case 1: 1900s to 1920s-era colored glass ring/1920s silver-plated hip flask with engraving "B.M." (Bud Maynard); Case 2: 1870-1871 German iron cross medallion from the Franco-Prussian War ("W" on it stands for King Wilheim)	April 20, 2013
The team travels to Henderson, Arkansas to investigate Lake Norfolk Inn where there are claims that a spirit grabs guests while going down the stairs. They learn that the Maynard family had generations of grave plots in their own cemetery that was flooded by the lake where the resort is located. Next, they head to Springfield, Missouri to investigate Pythian Castle where an unfriendly houseguest haunts its halls. The castle was built in 1913 by the Knights of Pythias and later owned by the U.S. Military and used as a service club for the soldiers. During World War II, the castle's basement may have been used by the army as a prison for Nazi S.S. agent POWs. In 1942, one of the Knights of Pythian, William Rensenbrink (German-born), had committed suicide when he cut his throat with a razor blade there.
28	"Hollywood Haunting /Gold Rush Ghost "	Case 1: 1919-1924 cigar box with music sheets Case 2: 1850s-period costume dress	April 27, 2013
The team travels to Hollywood, California to investigate a house in the Hollywood Hills that used to be Orson Welles's house when he was writing Citizen Kane. He is supposedly haunting the place where he spent two years as a recluse due to the bitter feud with William Randolph Hearst. They find an old cigar box with sheet music in the basement predating 1924 that belonged to Welles' mother named Beatrice who was a concert pianist and died when he was nine years old, which made him lose interest in music. Next, they head to Columbia, California, to investigate the Fallon Hotel (est. in 1847) & Theater (est. in 1857) in an old gold rush town.. When in costume, the hotel Front Desk Manager named Olivia Phillips resembles former saloon owner Martha Carlos who was the last face prominent miner named John Smith saw when he got into a physical altercation with her and was shot in the head by her husband.
29	"Haunted Seminary/Ghost Games "	Case 1: 1800s bonnet (with a secret pocket sewn inside for hiding items) and blouse (with bullet holes); Case 2: Late 1800s-1890s clay pendant (used for a game called "Hide the Thimble")	May 3, 2013
The team travels to Madison, Ohio to investigate the Madison Seminary, originally a boarding school built in 1864 that became a home for war widows in 1891 and then a state-run mental institution in 1949. Now it is haunted by the ghost of a nurse believed to be Elizabeth Brown Stiles, who became a spy for the Union after the Confederacy shot her husband to death in front of her during the Civil War. She was shot in the back while wearing her blouse and whale bone corset. Next, they head to Mendon, Massachusetts, to investigate a family's farmhouse built in 1874, where they hear children's running footsteps. The spirit is said to be Arthur Albee, who died when he was seven while sitting on a bridge with his sister during a game of "huckle buckle beanstalk" Huckle buckle beanstalk. He accidentally fell over and drowned into the creek near the house.
30	"House Of Pain/Antique Spirits"	Case 1: Inconclusive (no items determined to be haunted); Case 2: Late 1800s to early 1900s Casket handle and Trepanning tool (medical device to drill holes in human's skulls for mental illness or headaches)	May 10, 2013
The team travels to Pensacola, Florida, to investigate a Victorian house built in 1900 where each family member has experienced paranormal activity including seeing apparitions in their rooms. Famous American socialite Wallis Simpson, who married Prince Edward, Duke of Windsor, lived in the house with her abusive husband aviator Earl "Win" Winfield Spencer Jr. Next, they head to Monticello, Florida, to investigate Palmer House Antiques inside a house built in 1836 to help the owners keep their customers who are afraid to come back because they've seen a black and blue shadowman. The Palmer House was built by Dr. Thomas Palmer, who died in the house. His nephew Dr. Dabney Palmer, the town's physician, pharmacist and mortician who experimented on dead bodies in the basement and invented the "666" elixir to treat malaria, died there in 1909.

== See also ==
- Ghost hunting
- List of reportedly haunted locations in the United States
- List of reportedly haunted locations in the world
- Paranormal television
