= Caffé Vittoria =

Italian restaurant in Boston, Massachusetts, U.S.

Caffè Vittoria
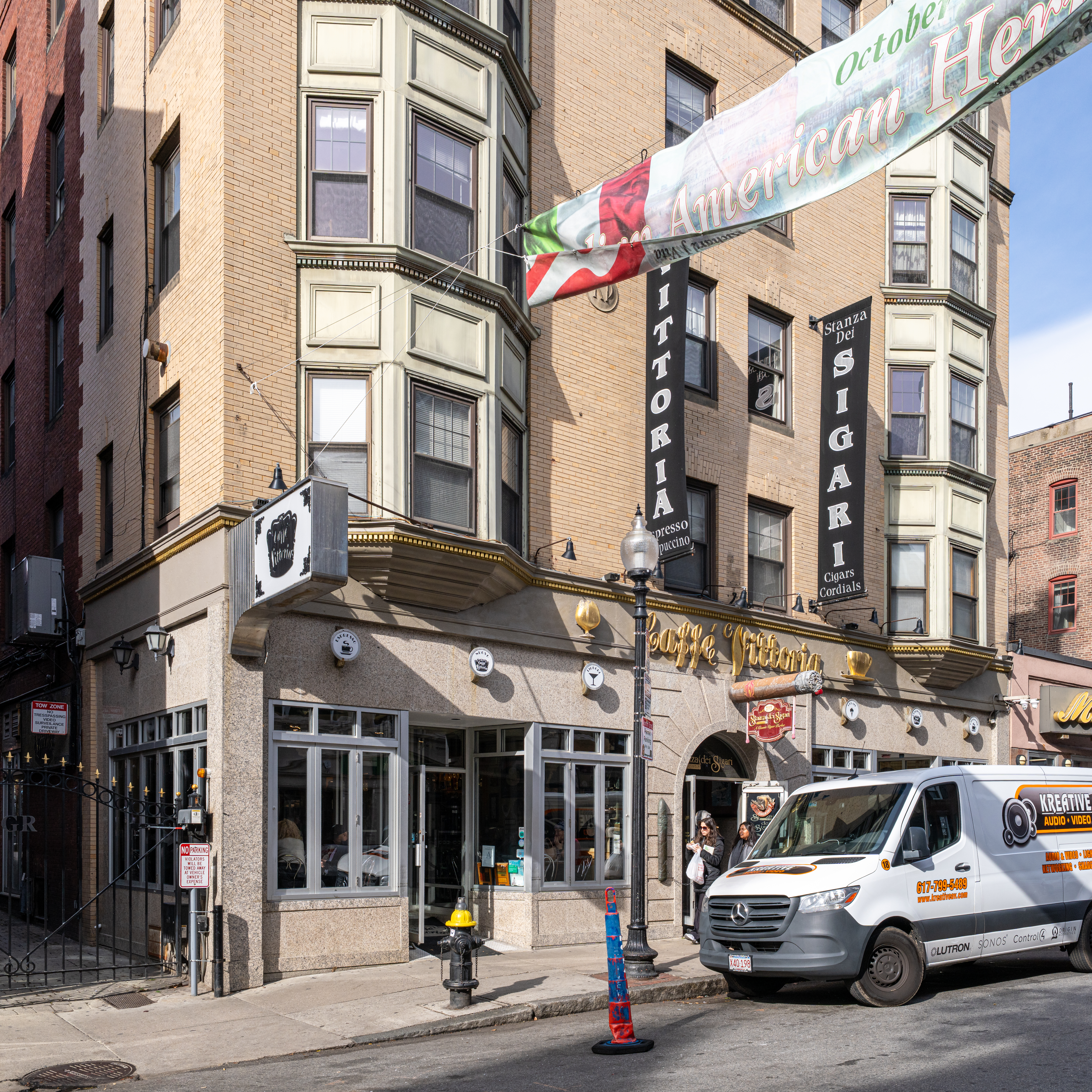

- Location within Massachusetts Location within Boston

Restaurant information
- Established: 1929; 97 years ago
- Owners: Gerald and David Riccio
- Food type: Italian
- Location: 290-296 Hanover Street, Boston, Massachusetts, 02113, United States
- Coordinates: 42.3642°N 71.0545°W
- Reservations: No
- Website: vittoriacaffe.com

Caffè Vittoria is an Italian cafe located on Hanover Street in the North End neighborhood of Boston, Massachusetts, United States. The cafe features four levels, three liquor bars, and a cigar room.

== History ==
Caffè Vittoria was established in 1929 as the first Italian cafe in Boston. It is located in the North End, the center of Boston's Italian population. In 1995, the owners opened a cigar bar in the basement called Stanza dei Sigari (English: Cigar Room). As of 2014, Stanza dei Sigari is the last surviving smoking lounge in the city of Boston. According to a few food review sources, Caffè Vittoria has some of the best hot chocolate and cappuccino in the United States.

Many celebrities and politicians frequent the North End hotspot for "Boston's best cappuccino and cannoli".

On March 13, 2013, Caffè Vittoria was featured in an episode of the television show Syfy's Haunted Collector. They interviewed the owners' son, David Riccio Jr., who submitted a video stating how some of his employees and customers were scared to be in the cigar bar due to paranormal activity. In the episode, John Zaffis and his team investigated the establishment, and discovered that the property at 292 Hanover Street once housed a baby farm. This particular baby farm was run by a woman named Ms. Elwood, who apparently abused and even killed some of the infants that were left there. The team also discovered a syringe from the 1870s buried within the building's foundation. After they removed the syringe from the property, the paranormal activity in the building ceased. The Boston Herald also dedicated its cover page to the story.

== Menu ==
Caffè Vittoria serves a variety of Italian delicacies, such as cannoli, tiramisu, and biscotti. They also have gelato, Italian-style ice cream with flavors such as spumoni and Biscuit Tortoni. The cafe serves sorbets in the summertime. Other desserts include rum cake and chocolate ganache.

Tea, hot chocolate, sciroppi, and espresso are also staples of the cafe. Espresso comes plain, or as cappuccino, caffè latte, caffè corretto, caffè macchiato, and latte macchiato. Around the cafe are displayed old-fashioned espresso machines.

== See also ==
- List of Italian restaurants
- History of Italian Americans in Boston
