= Scary =

Scary may refer to:

== Arts and entertainment ==
- "Scary" (song), by Stormzy, 2016
- "Scary", a song by Björk, a B-side of "Bachelorette", 1997
- "Scary", a song by Britney Spears from Femme Fatale, 2011
- "Scary", a song by Megan Thee Stallion and Rico Nasty from Traumazine, 2022
- Scary, a village in the Shire, in works by J. R. R. Tolkien
- Little Miss Scary, a Little Miss character

== Places ==
- Scary, West Virginia, U.S.

== People ==
- Mel B, Melanie Brown (born 1975), stage name Scary Spice, English singer, member of Spice Girls
- Sherri Martel (1958–2007), ringname Scary Sherri, American professional wrestler
- Terry Taylor (born 1955), ringname "Scary" Terry Taylor, American professional wrestler
- The Scary Guy (born 1953), American motivational speaker

== See also ==
- Horror
- Scared (disambiguation)
- Scary Movie film series
- Scarry, a surname
