= Scared (disambiguation) =

To be scared is to have fear. Scared may also refer to:

== Film and television ==
- Scared!, a paranormal reality TV series
- Scared (film), a 2005 Thai horror film

== Music ==
- Scared Records, an American record label
- "Scared" (The Tragically Hip song), 1995
- "Scared", a song by Ashanti from Ashanti, 2002
- "Scared", a song by Dangerous Toys from Dangerous Toys, 1989
- "Scared", a song by John Lennon from Walls and Bridges, 1974
- "Scared", a song by Paul McCartney from New, 2013
- "Scared", a song by Three Days Grace from Three Days Grace, 2003
- "Scared", a song by Zendaya from Zendaya, 2013
- Scared, an EP by Swingin' Utters, 1992

== Acronyms ==
- Screen for child anxiety related disorders, a screening measure for anxiety symptoms in children and adolescents

== See also ==
- Scary (disambiguation)
