= EDGLRD =

American creative and technology company

- Type: Private
- Industry: Experimental film; Animation; Video games; Designer toys; Skateboarding; Fashion; Virtual reality
- Founded: 2023; 3 years ago
- Founder: Harmony Korine
- Headquarters: Miami Beach, Florida, United States
- Website: edglrd.com

EDGLRD (pronounced "edgelord") is an American creative and technology company founded in 2023 by filmmaker Harmony Korine.

== History ==
EDGLRD collaborated with Bladee on his music video for "ONE SECOND" featuring Yung Lean, with The Weeknd for the cover of 032c Issue #45, and with Kim Kardashian for the Skims 2023 swimwear collection.

In May 2024, EDGLRD released the film Aggro Dr1ft, directed by Korine and starring Jordi Mollà and Travis Scott. The film has appeared in various venues, theaters, and subsequently in video on demand format via EDGLRD's website.

In June 2024, EDGLRD sold a limited run of Demon Masks inspired by Aggro Dr1ft for $1500 each, along with special edition skate decks and clothing.

The EDGLRD skateboarding team is based in Miami, led by skateboarder Sean Pablo. In August 2024, Eric Koston joined EDGLRD.

In August 2024, the Reuben Brothers acquired a strategic stake in the company.

Yeat released the surreal video for "Loose Leaf" from his Dangerous Summer (EP) on August 5, directed by EDGLRD and executive produced by Harmony Korine, featuring Yeat in a Florida motel surrounded by alligators.

EDGLRD's film Baby Invasion, a surreal, home invasion thriller, had its world premiere out of competition at the 81st Venice International Film Festival, on August 31, 2024.

The company's upcoming films include the adult animated films Twinkle Twinkle and The Trap, and the feature debut of acclaimed music video director Matias Vasquez, better known as Stillz.

Korine has described EDGLRD’s "post-cinema" works as "blinx", a term he has coined for their unconventional nature.

== Filmography ==
=== Feature films ===
==== Released ====
Year	Film	Directed by	Co-production companies	Distributor(s)
2023	Aggro Dr1ft	Harmony Korine	Iconoclast	EDGLRD
2024	Baby Invasion	Harmony Korine	Picture Perfect	EDGLRD
2025	Barrio Triste	Stillz	WeOwnTheCity	Film Movement

==== Upcoming ====
Year	Film	Directed by	Distributor(s)	Status
TBA	Twinkle Twinkle	Harmony Korine	EDGLRD	Post-production
TBA	The Trap	Harmony Korine	EDGLRD	In development

=== Short films ===
==== Released ====
Year	Film	Directed by	Co-production companies	Distributor(s)
2025	Point Cloud	N/A	N/A	EDGLRD

=== Video games ===
==== Released ====
Year	Game	Developer	Publisher(s)	Status
2026	Tamashika	QuickTequila	EDGLRD	Released April 10, 2026

=== Music videos ===
==== Released ====
Year	Music video	Directed by	Artist(s)	Label(s)
2024	One Second	Harmony Korine	Bladee	Trash Island
2025	Kick Out	Harmony Korine	JackBoys; Travis Scott	Cactus Jack; Epic Records
