= The Northwestern (band) =

Former English rock band

- Origin: Chichester, England
- Genre: Indie rock
- Years active: 2007–2012
- Past members: Sam Herlihy; Simon Jones; Francesco Menegat; Jonny Winter; Ian McCullagh

The Northwestern were an English indie rock band, formed by former Hope of the States members Sam Herlihy and Simon Jones.

Their first full tour commenced on 29 May 2009, playing eleven shows across the UK. Their debut single "Telephones" / "All The Ones", was released through Friends Vs. Records on 15 June 2009.

In November 2009, The Northwestern released their second vinyl, the Ghostrock EP (containing four tracks and released on 10" vinyl), to coincide with their final tour of the UK in 2009, visiting various venues around the UK.

The band split in 2012 and released a collection of demos posthumously via Bandcamp.

== Members ==
The band consists of:

- Sam Herlihy: Guitar/Vocals
- Simon Jones: Drums
- Francesco Menegat: Bass
- Jonny Winter: Guitar
- Ian McCullagh: Guitar

== Discography ==
- "Telephones"/"All The Ones" (7" single limited to 500 copies) 15 June 2009
- Ghostrock EP (10" single sold on tour and through a couple of internet sites – released November 2009)
