= Left (Hope of the States album) =

Studio album by Hope of the States
- Released: 19 June 2006
- Recorded: 2005–2006
- Genre: Alternative rock, indie rock
- Length: 49:41
- Label: Columbia
- Producer: Ken Thomas

Hope of the States chronology
The Lost Riots (2004)	Left (2006)

Singles from Left
- 1. "Blood Meridian" Released: 3 April 2006; 2. "Sing It Out" Released: 5 June 2006; 3. "Left" Released: 21 August 2006

Left is the second and final album by British band Hope of the States, released on 19 June 2006. It was released on CD, DualDisc CD/DVD, and as a limited edition double 10" vinyl LP. The album was described by the band as slightly more accessible and guitar-oriented than were the tracks on Hope of the States's debut, The Lost Riots.

The album was preceded by two singles, the limited edition "Blood Meridian" EP and "Sing It Out", with the latter reaching #39 on the UK singles charts. The album itself reached #50 on the UK album charts on its initial release. There followed a further single, the title track "Left", which charted at #63 in August 2006, shortly before the band announced their split.

== Track listing ==
1. "Seconds" – 1:52
2. "Blood Meridian" – 4:04
3. "Sing It Out" – 3:14
4. "Bonfires" – 4:24
5. "The Good Fight" – 4:19
6. "Left" – 5:26
7. "Industry" – 2:25
8. "This Is a Question" – 3:35
9. "Little Silver Birds" – 4:26
10. "Four" – 3:09
11. "January" – 4:48
12. "Forwardirektion:" – 3:19
13. "The Church Choir" – 6:53
