= Scared! =

- The title logo from early 2007.
- Also known as: Scared on Staten Island! (former)
- Genre: Documentary; Paranormal
- Starring: (See credited cast below.)
- Narrated by: Jason Porcino
- Country of origin: United States
- Original language: English
- No. of seasons: 5
- No. of episodes: 19

Production
- Executive producers: Chris Mancuso; Brian J. Cano
- Production location: Eastern United States
- Camera setup: Multiple
- Running time: 45–55 minutes
- Production companies: Core Films; Thousand Hats Productions

Original release
- Network: Staten Island Community Television
- Release: September 12, 2002 – 2010

Scared! (stylized as SCARED!), formerly titled as Scared on Staten Island!, is an American paranormal public-access television cable TV series that was first shown on September 12, 2002, on Staten Island Community Television. Produced by Core Films and Thousand Hats Productions, the program follows and stars a Staten Island-based team of urban explorers who venture into abandoned and condemned buildings in search of paranormal activity. In each episode, three main members, who are collectively known as "The SCARED! Crew" and who vary throughout the series, represent three points of view or beliefs: the psychic, scientist and skeptic.

== Cast's work in the paranormal field ==
In 2009, the cast began a weekly Internet radio show called Scared! on the Airwaves!, which served as an official companion to the documentary series. It coincided with their being represented by Night Management, whose client roster includes other names in the paranormal field, such as Brian Harnois and Patrick Burns. In October 2010, they moved to Ideal Event Management, who represent most of the TAPS members and others in the field.

The crew makes it a point to team up with local groups when doing an investigation and from time to time find themselves working with veterans in the field, such as John Zaffis and Rosemary Ellen Guiley. Their reputation for working well with others has led to them being requested to investigate places they might otherwise not have gone.

The executive producers, Brian J. Cano and Chris Mancuso, have begun appearing at paranormal conventions to promote the show and to give their lecture on urban exploration called "The Urban Explorer's Backpack". An article of the same name, written by Cano and Mancuso, in the Winter 2010 issue of Haunted Times magazine states, "There is a fine line between bravery and stupidity, so be sure to know the extent on your own limitations as well as the severity of any particular situation before you proceed."

In May 2010, they began filming a documentary on the life and work of the paranormal researcher and demonologist John Zaffis entitled, John Zaffis: The World Within. It was premiered in September 2010 at the Dragon Con convention in Atlanta, Georgia and was reviewed by TAPS Paramagazine as being, "beautifully shot and stunningly edited".

In 2011 Cano joined the cast of the SyFy series, Haunted Collector and was in every episode of its three-season run.

Cano is currently on "Paranormal Caught On Camera" which airs on the Travel Channel and will enter its third season in late 2020.

== Curtain Call ==
With the release of their final documentary, "Haunted Snug Harbor", in 2011, the team carried on for another year before slimming down to the duo of Mancuso and Cano. Several new documentaries were planned but never completed. In 2014, the team officially disbanded.

== Festivals and awards ==
In 2006, the episode at the Parsonage Restaurant appeared in the inaugural Staten Island Film Festival. The Eastern State Penitentiary episode appeared at the same festival in 2007.

In 2008, the Shanley Hotel episode won Best Editing at the Director's Chair Film Festival and the Philadelphia State Hospital episode won Best Editing and Best Local Film at the same festival in 2009. The Danvers Mental Institution episode was an Official Selection the same year in the Staten Island Film Festival.

In 2009, the group was recognized by the International Paranormal Acknowledgement Awards (IPAA) and given the award for Best Paranormal Music Score.

In 2010, CORE Films received an Aegis Award in the documentary category for the Grand Midway Hotel episode.

== Credited cast ==
Current members

- Chris Mancuso (2002–2014) – producer, lead investigator
- Brian J. Cano (2002–2014) – producer, head of science division
- Lisa Ann (2007–2012) – psychic/medium, head of psychic division
- Greg Cusick (2002–2012) – investigator
- Jason Porcino (2002–2012) – narrator, investigator

Former members

- Joe Rice (2002–2006) – producer, psychic
- Daniel Fasulo (2002-2004) - Rigger & Communications
- Erick Bonet (2002–2006) – security
- Wael "Shawn" Sharaydeh (2002–2009) – investigator
- Paul DiGennaro (2007–2011) – psychometric, psychic division
- Brooke Haramija (2009–2011) – case manager
- Karrie-Ann Versace (2010–2011) - equipment manager
- Edwin Martinez (2010–2011) - demonologist

== Episodes ==
=== Season 1 (2002–03) ===
All locations in season 1 are in Staten Island, New York.

#	Location	Original airdate
101	St. Augustine's Academy (The Monastery)	September 12, 2002
102	The Farm Colony at Sea View	October 20, 2002
103	Seaview Hospital	February 5, 2003
104	Staten Island Hospital	May 13, 2003
105	St. George Theatre	September 25, 2003
106	The Halloween Special	October 31, 2003

=== Season 2 (2004) ===
#	Title	Location	Original airdate
201	Review of Previous Episodes	—	2004
202	Graveyards of Staten Island	Staten Island, New York	2004
203	Danvers State Hospital	Danvers, Massachusetts	August 8, 2004

=== Season 3 (2006) ===
#	Title	Location	Original airdate
301	The Parsonage Restaurant	Staten Island, New York	February 3, 2006
302	Eastern State Penitentiary	Philadelphia, Pennsylvania	June 10, 2006
303	The Farm Colony at Sea View 2.0	Staten Island, New York	October 7, 2006

=== Season 4 (2008–09) ===
#	Location	Original airdate
401	Staten Island, New York - The Garibaldi-Meucci Museum	February 14, 2008
402	New Castle, New Hampshire - Portsmouth Harbor Light and Fort Constitution	April 17, 2008
403	Napanoch, New York - The Shanley Hotel	October 4, 2008
404	Danvers, Massachusetts - Danvers State Hospital 2.0	December 25, 2008
405	Philadelphia, Pennsylvania - Philadelphia State Hospital (Byberry)	March 18, 2009
406	Phoenixville, Pennsylvania - The Phoenixville Library	July 15, 2009
407	East Bridgewater, Massachusetts - The East Bridgewater Town Hall	September 15, 2009
408	Windber, Pennsylvania - The Grand Midway Hotel	December 31, 2009

=== Season 5 (2010) ===
#	Title	Location	Original airdate
501	The Urban Explorer's Backpack, Vol. 1	Various	March 14, 2010
502	The Lizzie Borden House	Fall River, Massachusetts - Lizzie Borden Bed and Breakfast	

== See also ==
- Ghost hunting
- List of reportedly haunted locations
- Paranormal television
