= Film Movement =

North American film distributor

- Website type: e-commerce
- Available in: English
- Founded: 2003
- Headquarters: New York City, {{{location_country}}}
- Area served: United States and Canada
- Products: DVDs
- Website: Filmmovement.com
- Launched: 2003

Film Movement is a North American distributor of independent and foreign films, which is based in New York City, founded in 2003.

== History ==
Film Movement was founded in 2003, and has released more than 250 feature films and shorts. Having grown from a DVD-of-the-month club, Film Movement's theatrical distribution strategy has evolved to include American independent films, documentaries, and foreign arthouse titles. Its catalog includes titles by directors such as Ryusuke Hamaguchi, Hirokazu Kore-eda, Maren Ade, Jessica Hausner, Andrei Konchalovsky, Andrzej Wajda, Diane Kurys, Ciro Guerra, and Mélanie Laurent.

In 2015, Film Movement launched its reissue label Film Movement Classics, featuring new restorations released theatrically as well as on Blu-ray and DVD, including films by such noted directors as Ang Lee, Éric Rohmer, Peter Greenaway, Bille August, Marleen Gorris, Takeshi Kitano, Arturo Ripstein, and Ettore Scola.

In January 2019, Film Movement acquired the reissue rights to seven films for its classics label, including Heroes Shed No Tears by John Woo and The Reflecting Skin starring Viggo Mortensen. And in 2020, it acquired the North American right to American Thief, an action thriller film directed by Miguel Silveira.

== Selected titles ==
- After the Storm
- The Ardennes
- Barrio Triste
- The Dancing Dogs of Dombrova
- Dead Pigs
- The Dynamiter
- Human Capital
- Oh Lucy!
- Playground
- Theeb
- Wheel of Fortune and Fantasy
- Red Island
- Eternal You
- My Sunshine
