= Fight Harm =

- A still from the film
- Directed by: Harmony Korine
- Written by: Harmony Korine
- Starring: Harmony Korine
- Cinematography: David Blaine
- Running time: 17 minutes (unedited extant footage)
- Country: United States
- Language: English

Fight Harm is an abandoned slapstick reality comedy film by Harmony Korine. Filmed in New York City in 1999, the premise was to verbally provoke passersby into a fight. The rules were that Korine could not throw the first punch and that the person confronted had to be bigger than Korine. To Korine, Fight Harm was high-comedy reminiscent of Buster Keaton. "I wanted to push humour to extreme limits to demonstrate that there's a tragic component in everything." The film was ultimately abandoned following the injuries and arrests Korine faced while shooting.

== Production ==
Filming began sometime in 1999 in Manhattan, with a camera crew headed by David Blaine. The production was halted at one time while Korine served at least one prison sentence for offences related to the film. Before each fight, Korine would get drunk. Nine were filmed in total which only surmounted to seventeen minutes worth of footage. The project took a massive toll on both Korine and the people involved. In one interview he recounted the reaction a bouncer had after finding out the fight was for a film:

[He] got so sad when he found out... He was like, "Oh my God, if I knew this, I never would have touched the guy!" And so he signs the release form. And the girl beside him is totally in tears, the stripper. She's like, "Don't sign it! He's not a director – he needs to be locked up in a mental institute!"

Production for Fight Harm was shelved around September 1999 as a result of extensive injuries sustained and Korine's own underestimation of the length of fights.

== Release ==
Footage from Fight Harm is believed to have been exhibited at some point at the Alleged Gallery in New York. Photographs of injuries receiving during production were also reportedly featured in an issue of the skateboarding magazine Thrasher.

In 2010, Korine gave an update as to whether or not he would release the footage:

"I go back and forth. My wife is really adamant about me not showing it at this point. She thinks I need to wait another ten [years] for it to be really funny. The only purpose of these fights was to make the world's greatest slapstick comedy, something that Buster Keaton or The Three Stooges would have been jealous of."

On November 16, 2018, at the Key West Film Festival, Korine shared a clip from his phone to an audience. This was the first time anyone outside of the production crew saw it.
