= Baby Invasion =

2024 film directed by Harmony Korine

- Film poster
- Directed by: Harmony Korine
- Screenplay by: Harmony Korine
- Produced by: Judd Allison; James Clauer; Xlord
- Starring: Juan Bofill; Shawn Thomas; Steven Rodriguez; Antonio Jackson; Tej Limlas Ly
- Cinematography: Joao Rosa
- Edited by: Adam Robinson; Leo Scott
- Music by: Burial
- Production companies: EDGLRD; Picture Perfect
- Distributed by: EDGLRD
- Release dates: August 31, 2024 (Venice); March 21, 2025 (VOD)
- Running time: 80 minutes
- Country: United States
- Language: English

Baby Invasion is a 2024 American experimental thriller film written and directed by Harmony Korine, produced through his EDGLRD multimedia company. The film centers on a home invasion, in which the protagonist murderers' faces are swapped with baby faces using artificial intelligence. According to Korine, the film is structured as a first-person shooter game with interactive elements.

The film had its world premiere out of competition at the 81st Venice International Film Festival, on August 31, 2024. The film had its United States premiere at Fantastic Fest 2024, on September 23, 2024.

== Plot ==
A masked gamer sits at his computer and plays a game titled Baby Invaders. Inside the game and from a first-person perspective, a group of "avatars" with AI-generated baby faces loot a house, take selfies, and play a first-person shooter game. They join other players and taunt a second group as a Twitch-inspired livestream chat appears on the left, before riding in the back of a van. A global feed tracks their group, known as Duck Mobb, and their leader, known as Mr. Yellow. The Mobb arrive at a mansion and breaks inside, taking the residents hostage. Yellow sees an AI-generated white rabbit swimming in water while looking at a lake behind the mansion.

In a webcam, three other masked gamers sit in front of a screen wearing headsets.

The Mobb steal cash, food, clothes and champagne. Back outside, other players have murdered two hostages. Yellow makes an in-game purchase for pills and does cocaine. A giant metallic baby head with demonic horns rises from the water and speaks to him. Then, a nude giant attacks Yellow in a boss fight, and he defeats it. At night, Yellow watches a clip from the game being played at the beginning. Suddenly, he is inside a tunnel made of duplicates of the clip, with the masked gamer watching him from the end. Yellow runs backwards until he falls out the back of the tunnel.

An unknown player makes their way to an office and finds a marker at a security desk that reads "Get to work." The monitors display a CCTV feed of another mansion. The player watches as a group of other players invade the mansion, taking hostages and robbing it. One player rides around on a yellow bicycle while another chases a hostage through the hallways before catching her.

In a black void, a group of horned, white silhouettes dance while holding guns.

A pop-up message from the Operator reveals the group to be the Duck Mobb and orders Mr. Yellow to find and open a safe. Yellow walks around the mansion collecting coins before the group of horned players appears again, now marked as intruders.

The unknown player leaves the security desk to explore the rest of the office, realising all the lights have been turned off.

From a GoPro, the three masked gamers livestream themselves entering an apartment and attacking the owner.

Yellow sees a white rabbit hop towards a large fence gate, and two horned avatars acknowledge him. After taking a hostage outside to extract information is unsuccessful, Yellow rides around the house on a scooter. The Mobb find the safe and Purple drills through it, revealing a huge sum of cash inside. After looting it, Yellow plays a minigame. When he returns inside, everything appears distorted and changes rapidly. Yellow continues riding the bicycle while the others play basketball. Through a series of pop-ups, the Mobb rounds up the remaining hostages. At night, Yellow rides an electric wheelchair. When he collects a coin, he is teleported into a video-game room.

Three masked burglars break into an elderly man's houseboat, robbing it and brutally murdering him.

From a player's perspective (presumably Yellow), a group of pigs stand around a dead pig, before cutting back to the wheelchair. A pop-up reads "Play Time". While in the pool, Yellow sees a giant white rabbit beneath the surface. The Mobb take a photo in front of the mansion. Digital fireworks go off, and they wave 'goodbye' before escaping in the van. A pop-up reads "Level Complete."

Inside another tunnel, distorted videos play on a loop. One includes footage of the home invasion. Another clip includes the homeboat invasion. At the end is a room of metallic mannequins facing a rabbit surrounded by a velvet rope. The unknown player (presumably Yellow) turns to see a four-legged humanoid mob attacking them. They retreat into the TV static and see the white rabbit running to the fence gate again. The Mobb find themselves in this location, and from the first-person perspective of a levitating God-like figure, two lightning-wielding hands electrocute them to death. He rises into the sky. A rabbit forms from the stars.

== Cast ==
- Anonymous as Yellow
- Juan Bofill as Blue
- Shawn Thomas as Red
- Steven Rodriguez as Green
- Antonio Jackson as Orange
- Tej Limlas Ly as Purple
- Scott Ference as Wheelchair Man

== Production ==
In an interview with Variety, Korine characterized Baby Invasion as well as his previous EDGLRD production Aggro Dr1ft as works of "post-cinema" which he termed "blinx" for their unconventional nature. British electronic producer Burial created an original score for the film. Of the score, Korine said, "I never actually met Burial and I never actually spoke with Burial. So it was all done through Discord messages, and we'd kind of talk on PS5. And then the music was sent through PS5."

The cast have little or no acting experience, apart from Scott Ference who played a little person in Aggro Dr1ft.

Visual effects for Baby Invasion were created using artificial intelligence and video game engines. The film credits two "AI artists", three "AI engineers", and four "AI whisperers". According to the film assets available via the EDGLRD website, the clips featuring the white rabbit were made using Runway's Gen-3 Alpha video generation.

== Release ==
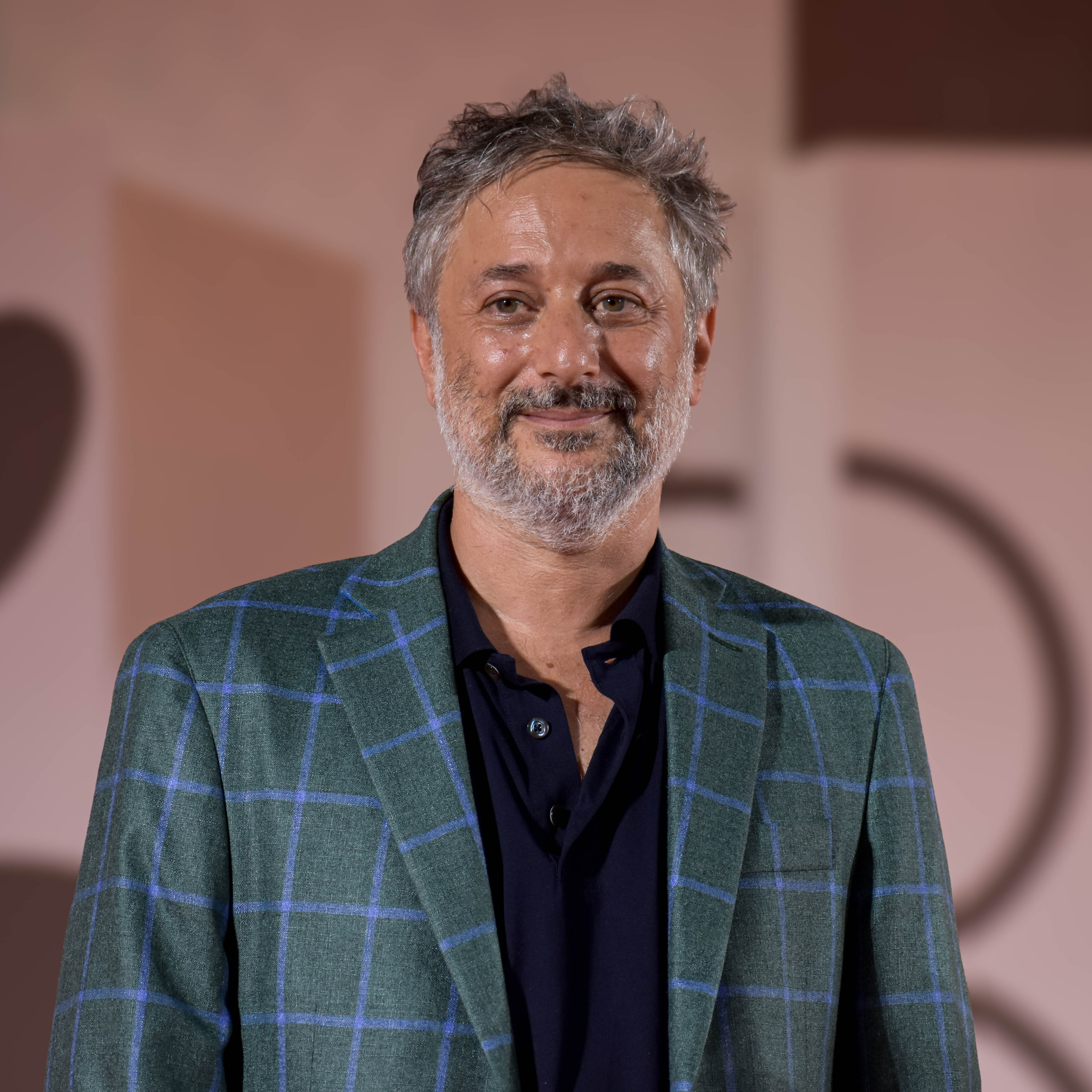
Korine at the 81st Venice International Film Festival

Baby Invasion premiered out of competition at the 81st Venice International Film Festival on August 31, 2024. During the Venice press conference, Korine sat next to visual effects artist Joao Rosa and fellow filmmaker Gaspar Noé, who was wearing a neon green mask, and smoked a cigar, causing smoke to fill the conference room. He expressed that "Hollywood ... would be smart to — encourage the youth, the kids. Why we're starting to see Hollywood crumble creatively is because they're losing a lot of the most creative minds to gaming and to streaming. They're so locked in on convention and then all those kids who are so creative are now just going to find other pathways and go to other places because movies are no longer the dominant art form." He also revealed that, "When we release the film, there'll be a way to watch it through your phone, but there'll be certain codes within the movie that'll take you to other movies. So the film, what you're seeing, is just a base layer film. There'll be three or four other sub films."

The film was released on video on demand on March 21, 2025.

== Reception ==
On the review aggregator website Rotten Tomatoes, 40% of 15 critics' reviews are positive, with an average rating of 5/10. On Metacritic, the film holds an average score of 36 out of 100 based on reviews from 8 critics, indicating "generally unfavorable reviews".

Peter Debruge of Variety gave the film a mixed review, writing "though little more than a gimmick, the baby angle gives Korine a hook for an experiment that's only intermittently engaging for much of its running time."
