= Scarry =

Scarry is a surname and it may refer to:

- Elaine Scarry (born 1946), American essayist and professor
- Mike Scarry (1920–2012), American football player and coach
- Richard Scarry (1919–1994), American children's author and illustrator
