= King House (Mayport) =

Coordinates: 30.39313°N 81.43058°W

King House is a historic building on 4627 Ocean St, Mayport, Florida, believed by some to be haunted by the spirit of a sailor.

It is not known when the original building was constructed. The first record of the building is from April 25, 1881, when it was destroyed by a fire. The records note that before its destruction it was used as a boarding house for sailors and that the land had previously been used as a Spanish graveyard.

The building was reconstructed by William Joseph King in 1907 and was occupied by his son until his death in 1977. During this time, due to reports of hauntings, the house was investigated by researchers from the Rhine Institute of Duke University and several other paranormal research groups. A rocking chair was purported to move on its own accord. It had been reported that an aunt of William King had been pitchforked to death on the same chair by a jealous sailor ex-boyfriend. The house was also used as the local Catholic church in the 1940s and mass was held there every week. Congregants reported hearing high-heels moving about in the attic when no-one was there.

Other supposed ghosts who occupy the building include a 'Little Butler' who is said to open doors for visitors and guide them into the living room. There have also been sightings of a maid in the kitchen who acts aggressively towards those using 'her' space. A bride who died in a car crash outside the house on her wedding day is also rumored to haunt the building.

The book Jetty Man by Bill Reynolds was released about the hauntings and house in 1999.

The house is currently used as a centre of operations for the Mayport Cats Program, which assists feral cats.
