= The Shame of the States =

1948 book by Albert Deutsch

- First edition
- Author: Albert Deutsch
- Language: English
- Genre: Non-fiction
- Publisher: Harcourt, Brace & Co.
- Publication date: 1948
- Publication place: United States

The Shame of the States is a 1948 book by journalist and social activist Albert Deutsch on the conditions of state mental hospitals in the United States the 1940s. Deutsch, praised as a crusader, nevertheless wrote in the preface of this book that "the day of the individual crusader is over." Taking an historically informed approach, he called for a public reform movement as the only way to enact significant change of the state mental hospital system, emphasizing lack of state funding as the cause of the problems he witnessed (mainly the "twin diseases" of overcrowding and understaffing), and pointing towards a lack of public pressure on state representatives as the ultimate reason for the hospitals' limited budgets.

== Publication history ==
This book was originally published in 1948, after years of research by Deutsch on the history of public welfare, public care of the mentally ill, psychiatry, and public care of veterans in America, and after many other publications on those topics. Having worked the six years previous as a columnist for the New York Post, writing about public health, he was able to use many of his earlier experiences in visiting mental hospitals and speaking with key figures there as source material for this newest book. The book itself was anticipated by both the public health community and general public, as Deutsch's career as a journalist had made him relatively well-known.

The original publication, marked "first edition," was dedicated "to the sick and the sorrowing in the hope that the mists will be lifted and the shame erased." Deutsch also quoted The Philosophy of Insanity on the title page, an autobiographical text by a "Late Inmate of the Glasgow Royal Asylum for the Lunatics at Garnavel." The quote encapsulates one of Deutsch's main goals in writing The Shame of the States – that the public will come to understand that the mentally ill are no less human than themselves, and equally as deserving of basic dignities and care—and is as follows. "Lunacy, like the rain, falls upon the evil and the good; and although it must forever remain a fearful misfortune, yet there may be no more sin or shame in it than there is in an ague fit or a fever."

The Shame of the States was reprinted in 1973, as part of the Arno Press Collection ″Mental Illness and Social Policy: The American Experience.″ The editorial board chose to include this book over of any of Deutsch's other works on American psychiatry and health care.

== Sources and influences ==
In the introduction to this book, Dr. Karl A Menninger describes Deutsch as neither a doctor nor psychiatrist, but rather a "scientifically trained student and recorder of social conditions," who, as reporter, "knows how to describe vividly as well as accurately what he sees, and to interpret it in terms which the public understands." He further characterizes Deutsch as familiar with "practical politics," and thus accurate in his assessment that the system can change if the public knew what was going on and expressed their concern to legislators. Deutsch's goal in writing this book, he says, is to break the "conspiracy of silence"—to "inform the public and to make the public care."

Deutsch supports this assertion in his preface, describing himself as a "part of the movement for civilized, humane, and scientific treatment of those who cannot speak for themselves," a movement begun by Dorothea Dix in the early 19th century and continued by such figures as Nellie Bly and Clifford Beers, the latter of whom Deutsch had personally worked with.

As mentioned above, much of the source material Deutsch used in compiling his account of state hospitals was primary. In many cases, he requested and was granted a tour of a facility by the superintendent—in other words, the head doctor and administrator. Throughout the book, he directly quotes the various doctors, administrators, staff, patients, and state government representatives whom he met and interviewed, and augments their observations, and his own, with notes on the statistics of mental illness, patient demographics, rates of staff turnover and salary, local state policy and budget, and APA regulations dictating the minimum requirements for care. Additionally, he cites secondary sources such as internal reports on injuries and deaths in the hospitals, and state investigations into and surveys and indictments of hospital conditions. When describing how he obtained such intimate access to the facilities he visited, when his acknowledged goal was to expose their ineffectiveness and abuse, Deutsch writes "the plain fact is that most of these men welcomed the opportunity to get the true story before the public...They had become increasingly aware of the fact that only an enlightened public opinion could move state administrators to take the measures needed to stave off complete institutional collapse."

Deutsch gathered his source material between 1944 and 1947. Several of the interviewees he quotes were conscientious objectors (COs), assigned as staffers to state mental hospitals in lieu of military service. The National Mental Health Foundation which Deutsch describes in the penultimate chapter was in fact founded by a group of these CO attendants. Deutsch himself also felt the end of World War II keenly, as a significant amount of his research and writing in 1945 was concentrated on conditions in veterans' hospitals, with regards to both physical and psychiatric facilities—much what he discovered was published as a series on the maltreatment of veterans for the PM. The House World War Veterans Legislation Committee cited him for contempt of Congress in 1945 for refusing to reveal his sources within the Veterans Administration (though this citation was later rescinded).

In his preface, Deutsch frames his book as an account of conditions that have not essentially changed despite the months that have passed since his original research, and which have in fact worsened despite the "ambitious postwar planning programs." Those programs, he writes, "have been blocked or dropped as a wave of budget retrenchment has hit one state after another, with resulting deterioration of services. Apparent budget increases are eaten up by inflationary costs." In this regard, the postwar context within which Deutsch was writing was again significant. Though he acknowledges that already dire staff shortages were made worse by the drafting of hundreds of medical professionals, he characterizes accusations that hospital conditions were worsened because of the war, having previously been quite good, as simply false.

== Content ==
The book is divided into six parts, with a total of twenty-two chapters. Within these chapters, Deutsch evaluates the conditions of twelve state hospitals for mental illness (both how their patients are cared for and the conditions under which they are required to operate), examines his society's current conceptions of mental illness and how the mentally ill are treated, examines the role of patients' families, discusses how care for the mentally ill has evolved, declares how and why the current system is broken, and suggests how it might be reformed.

=== Part One ===
In this section, which covers chapters one through three, Deutsch assesses his society's current ideas about the mentally ill and how they are cared for, refuting common misconceptions about how they are a minority that is dangerous to society, and how they can be safely admitted to and locked away in state facilities where they are actively cared for at no larger cost to society. He cites a 1946 American Medical Association survey, saying that 51.3% of patients admitted to American hospitals on any given day are mental patients, and gives further statistics which evidence that "mental illness is now America's number one health problem"—all this to say that the general public has more of a stake in the state of care for the mentally ill than they realize, as they or a family member likely belong to this under acknowledged population.

Deutsch sets forth his main argument, which is that "real reform of our state hospitals hinges on acceptance of a single fundamental truth: mental patients are people, however sick they may be." He goes on to support the state as the "only public administrative unit able to provide adequate institutional facilities," and having been initially charged with this task out of historical necessity, is therefore responsible for active care for the mentally ill regardless of their ability to pay. Deutsch describes how the bare minimum threshold of care, according to the APA, is not being met: state facilities are too small, tremendously overcrowded, and horrifically understaffed, they lack appropriate therapeutic equipment and are unable to engage in research or enact any possible new methods of care, and moreover foster an "atmosphere of defeatism."

Ultimately, however, "the most serious defects arise from the deadly monotony of asylum life, the regimentation, the depersonalization and dehumanization of the patient...the contempt for human dignity." The system as it is now, he writes, costs us socially as well as financially: current patients have little to no chance of recovery and will probably be supported for the state for their entire life, with no chance to become contributing members of society.

=== Parts Two, Three, and Four ===
These sections are dedicated to descriptions of certain hospitals that Deutsch visited; he made a survey of over thirty psychiatric institutions nationwide, but featured a few in particular as representative of the general bad conditions. These include: Philadelphia State Hospital for Mental Diseases (Byberry), Cleveland State Hospital, Manhattan State Hospital, Napa State Hospital, Rockland State Hospital, Milledgeville State Hospital, Bellevue Psychiatric Hospital, Detroit Receiving Hospital, and Letchworth Village. He strongly condemns both a quantitative and qualitative lack of resources as the number one cause of the problems he witnessed, problems which included severe overcrowding, understaffing, lack of training of the present staff, frequent assaults committed by staff or fellow patients, physical deterioration of buildings paired with the deterioration of staff morale, over reliance on mechanical restraint of patients, logistical complications caused by segregation, political pressure to spend less and move patients out faster, etc. Overall, he describes a lack of adequate active care, and moreover, lack of even adequate "custodial care." He also distinguishes the mentally ill from less severe cases, writing, "if the plight of the mentally sick in state hospitals is generally appalling, the plight of families with low-grade mental defectives at home is desperate, too. It is all part of the tragic picture of the public neglect of the mentally handicapped."

Chapter ten, entitled "Euthanasia Through Neglect?," is a scathing indictment of the public's "murderous apathy." He offers Dr. Karl Brandt as a comparison, writing "no, indeed, we are not like the Nazis. We do not kill off 'insane' people coldly as a matter of official state policy...We do it by neglect." He appeals to the public to stop "buck-passing the blame to institutional scapegoats" and act, asking "how much more documented detail must be dug up before a so-called civilized people can be galvanized into remedial action?"

=== Parts Five and Six ===
Part Five, subtitled "Why It Needn't Be" and Part Six, subtitled "Towards the Light," summarize Deutsch's thoughts and look towards the future. He reiterates chapter ten, writing that the "real culprit" of the "chronic evils and abuses" present in state hospitals is not the individual scapegoat, responsible for some tale of "asylum horror," but rather the state hospital system itself—a system which has allowed its institutions to become "principally custodial" rather than "hospitals in the true sense of the word." He denies the claim that "such conditions are an inevitable part of a state care system," pointing to the reformed VA as an example. He recapitulates his view that "the public is ultimately responsible for the inhuman conditions that exist on the wards of many mental hospitals. But an uninformed public cannot exercise that responsibility constructively...It is up to hospital officials, in possession of the facts, to share them frankly with the public." He briefly describes conditions in three more hospitals—Mason General, Brooklyn State, and Columbus State – as examples of what a more adequately supplied facility can achieve. And it is not just greater financial resources that help improve conditions, Deutsch points out, but a better attitude toward the patients among a more highly qualified staff.

In closing, Deutsch enumerates the forces already in action for the reform of mental institutions, including groups such as the National Mental Health Foundation, the American Psychiatric Foundation, and the Group for the Advancement of Psychiatry (GAP). He also notes the following as contributing to reform of the old system: the new "open-door" policy of the APA, various "journalistic specialists" who value "institutional investigation" over condemning scapegoats, and the federal government's National Mental Health Act. Finally, Deutsch describes his "ideal state hospital" and offers readers suggestions on how to "transform [it] from a goal to a practical reality."

== Critical reception ==
Upon its original publication, The Shame of the States was reviewed incredibly favorably. Most reviewers worked in public health, or as journalists, and would have been acquainted with Deutsch's work, or even with Deutsch personally. Reviews emphasize the shockingly vivid, sensational, and thought-provoking nature of the descriptions and photographs in the book, as well as the pervasiveness of the poor conditions uncovered and the fact that Deutsch can be considered a "lay expert" in this field. They commend Deutsch on a number of fronts: his courage in investigating these facilities, his compassion in describing the plight of the patients, his sensitivity to detail, and his acknowledgment that the conditions are not the fault of the "officials and doctors who run these hospitals." "This book should be a must for our voters and legislators," one reviewer from the Illinois Department of Public Welfare closes with, supporting Deutsch's view that disseminating the information he uncovered to the public was a matter of urgency.

The book was similar in impact to The Snake Pit, garnering a mixed reaction of shock, interest, and denial. In a New York Times article published only a year after the book, writer Lucy Freeman makes this comparison directly, describing mental hospital officials as operating "what have been called the country's 'snake pits' and 'shame of the states'." She also quotes Dr. George S. Stevenson, president of the APA and director of the National Committee for Mental Hygiene at the time, and a figure also quoted by Deutsch, on the reaction of the public. "Dr. Stevenson said that he did not believe that it was so much a matter of apathy, but of a feeling in people that makes them say, 'I don't want to see the movie, The Snake Pit, or, 'It makes me sick just to think of a mental hospital.' There is an aroused interest in mental hospitals, but it is shown mainly by 'pointing a finger at a Governor or a superintendent,' he said, so that an unsatisfactory situation can be explained in terms 'outside themselves.'" This was the very attitude that Deutsch was trying to counteract with The Shame of the States, and while the book did have a major effect on public opinion, it did not single-handedly galvanize a national movement. Deutsch continued to speak and write on the condition of public health services for the rest of his career.

== Legacy ==
Upon his death in 1961, at age 55, Deutsch was remembered by the public as a "leading American writer on mental health problems," and by the health community as a driven friend, one dedicated to improving America's psychiatric care system who worked tirelessly towards that goal. Only two years after his death, the Community Mental Health Act was passed, in response to a "genuine shift in attitudes toward the mentally ill during postwar years." In a 2003 New York Times article, writer Sally Satel points towards "exposes like Albert Deutsch's book 'The Shame of the States' and popular entertainment like the movie 'The Snake Pit'" as major contributors to this shift in attitude. However, this shift in attitude, while helpful in moving patients out of the overcrowded state institutions and encouraging the development of centers for personalized treatment and rehabilitation, ultimately had mixed results. Today, most mentally ill people are either caught in a "revolving door" between their communities and a local institution, are homeless, or are in prison—the latter two living circumstances being precisely those that Deutsch cited in The Shame of the States as the only other options for those not already housed in a state institution, and those which he was trying to resolve. Satel's tone is reminiscent of Deutsch's as she calls releasing the mentally ill from state institutions "only a first step," and calls for freedom from the "'cold mercy' that comes with criminalizing mental illness."

According to the National Institute of Mental Health, today 1 in 5 adults experiences mental illness in a given year—and about 1 in 25 experience a mental illness that substantially interferes with or limits one or more major life activities. From a survey conducted by SAMHSA in 2014, about 41% of the former category received mental health services in that year, and about 62.9% of those with a serious mental illness (the latter category) received health services.
