= Aggro Dr1ft =

2023 film by Harmony Korine

- Theatrical release poster
- Directed by: Harmony Korine
- Starring: Jordi Mollà; Travis Scott
- Cinematography: Arnaud Potier
- Edited by: Leo Scott
- Music by: AraabMuzik
- Production companies: EDGLRD; Iconoclast
- Distributed by: EDGLRD
- Release dates: September 2, 2023 (Venice); May 10, 2024 (United States); June 27, 2024 (Worldwide VOD)
- Running time: 80 minutes
- Country: United States
- Language: English
- Box office: $201,351

Aggro Dr1ft (stylized in all caps) is a 2023 American experimental action crime film directed by Harmony Korine, and produced by Korine's EDGLRD and Iconoclast. Starring Jordi Mollà and Travis Scott, its plot follows an assassin on a mission to kill a demonic crime lord. The film is presented entirely in infrared photography.

Aggro Dr1ft had its world premiere at the 80th Venice International Film Festival on September 2, 2023. It appeared in various venues, before releasing in limited theaters for a week starting on May 10, 2024. It was released on international video on demand through EDGLRD's website on June 27, 2024.

== Premise ==
"The film orbits around a melancholic assassin named BO (Jordi Mollà) as he prepares to vanquish a demonic crime lord in a Floridian realm of vivid pinks, blazing yellows, and deep purples."

The movie is shot entirely through thermal lens as BO navigates a twisted world where violence and madness reign supreme. Tensions unravel, leading to a psychedelic journey that blurs the lines between predator and prey.

== Cast ==
- Jordi Mollà as BO
- Travis Scott as Zion
- Joshua Tilley as Toto
- Stet Blancett as Pepe
- Chanya Middleton as BO's wife
- Xavier Rawson as BO's son
- Madison Anderson as BO's daughter

== Production ==
In July 2023, it was announced Harmony Korine had directed an untitled film shot entirely in infrared, with Travis Scott set to star, after previously collaborating on Circus Maximus which released that same year. Korine stated at the Locarno Film Festival, "I am excited. I have never made anything like it. I was trying not to make a movie. I don’t know if it will be a scandal, but it will be its own statement."

== Release ==
Aggro Dr1ft had its world premiere at the 80th Venice International Film Festival on September 2, 2023. It also screened at the 2023 Toronto International Film Festival on September 11, 2023, and at the 61st New York Film Festival in the Spotlight Gala section. The film was screened at the Los Angeles strip club Crazy Girls on February 7 and 8, 2024.

The film was later presented in a "world tour" accompanied by audiovisuals and DJ sets, starting in Elsewhere in Bushwick, Brooklyn on April 16, before heading to London and Tokyo. Eventually, the film would have a limited theatrical run in select cities from May 10 to 16. The film was released internationally in video on demand format on June 27, 2024, exclusively on the website of Korine's media company, EDGLRD.

== Reception ==
On the review aggregator website Rotten Tomatoes, 41% of 39 critics' reviews are positive, with an average rating of 3.5/10. The website's consensus reads: "Aggro Dr1ft's innovative and eye-catching visuals are largely undermined by a frequently inscrutable story that aims for provocation but too often frustrates and annoys." On Metacritic, the film holds an average score of 47 out of 100 based on reviews from 15 critics, indicating "mixed or average reviews".

In a positive review, Mark Hanson of Slant Magazine wrote that the film "crafted an experience that’s worth tripping out to, cotton mouth be damned". Peter Debruge of Variety gave the film a mixed review, writing that the film "is visually thrilling but somewhat tedious to sit through — better as wallpaper than the main attraction." Bilge Ebiri of Vulture was more negative in his review. In response to Harmony Korine claiming that "he wasn’t trying to make a movie", Ebiri quipped "Well, he hasn’t."
