= Hunt the thimble =

Party game

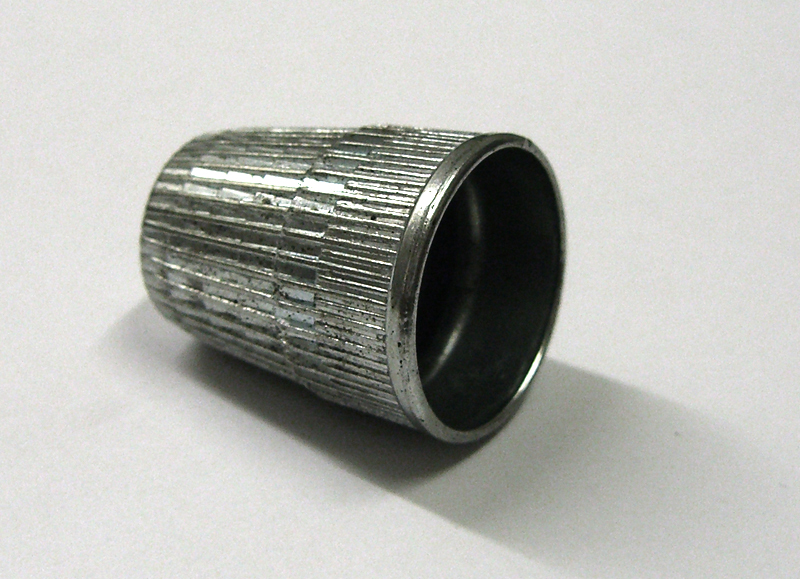
A thimble

Hunt the thimble (also known as hide the thimble or hide the handkerchief in both the US and the UK) is a party game in which one person hides a thimble, or other small object, somewhere in the room, while all other players wait outside. (In some versions of the game, it must be hidden in plain sight.) When everyone returns, they race to locate the hidden object. The first to find it is the winner, and hides it for the next game.

Huckle buckle beanstalk (or Huckleberry bean stalk) is a similar childhood game. The game has also been known as hot buttered beans in the US since at least 1830, and other names for it include hide the object and hide the key. William Wells Newell described a version called thimble in sight in his 1883 Games and Songs of American Children. The game is called cache-tampon in France. In Germany the game of Topfschlagen involves a blindfolded player trying to find a pot guided, by calls of hot or cold, and similar versions (without the blindfold) are played in Poland (Ciepło-zimno) and in Russia (Kholodno-goryacho, both meaning "hot and cold"). The game is played under names such as La candelita (The Little Fire) in Spanish speaking countries.

== Gameplay ==
The seekers must cover their eyes and ears or leave the designated game area while the hider hides a small, pre-selected object. When the hider says to come and find it, or after the seekers have counted to a specific number, usually sixty or one hundred, the seekers come out and attempt to be the first to find the object. When a seeker has the object in hand, they announce this to the other players.

Brian Sutton-Smith and other writers put this in a category of "central person" games which give one individual child a central role. The set-up can be reversed with that role given to a single seeker, while all the other players try to keep an object hidden from the odd-one-out, either by sending him out of the room while hiding it, or by passing it round behind their backs. This is a common way of organising 'Hide the Key' or 'Hunt the Slipper'.

== Variations ==
In some versions of the game, the hider tell the searchers what "temperature" they are, based on proximity to the hidden object—a player far away from the item may be told that they are "very cold", while one moving towards the object would be "getting warmer". Charles Dickens refers to this in his 1870 novel The Mystery of Edwin Drood:

...like the children in the game of hot boiled beans and very good butter, he was warm in his search when he saw the Tower, and cold when he didn't see it.

Other variations involve only one person leaving the room and everybody else hiding the object. In Singing Hunt the Thimble, the hiders sing louder when the searcher is close to the object and softer when they are further away.

A variation of the game has the person who finds the object, continue by pretending to look for the object and then call out "Huckle Buckle Bean Stalk" to draw the other seekers attention away from the object's location. As the other seekers find the object, they perform the same deception until all the seekers have found the object. The winners take pride in how quickly they find the object and how much time passes between them and the next player to call out.

== History ==
Games played like this, sometimes with children forming a circle round the seeker, sometimes with one child blindfolded, pre-date Victorian parlour games. In 1838 Hunt the Slipper, played as a single-seeker circle game, was said by one writer to be "nearly out of fashion" in Southern England. In 1766 Oliver Goldsmith described it being played in The Vicar of Wakefield, calling it a "primaeval pastime".

Both one-seeker and one-hider approaches have been associated with Hot Boiled Beans. A seeker may be called to enter the room and look for something hidden with, "Hot boiled beans and butter; walk in and find your supper!" This can be traced back to at least the mid-19th century. Several similar rhymes from different parts of England were recorded by 19th century folklorist Alice Gomme. They were sung or recited in games with one or more hiders: for example, "Little pigs come to supper/Hot boiled beans and ready butter." Other names were 'Hot Broad Beans' and 'Hot Beans and Butter.' In the US, the variations 'Hot Beans and Butter' and 'Hot Peas and Butter' require that the hidden item be a belt, which is placed in a secret location by a single hider. The other players are seekers. The first seeker to locate the belt can then attempt to whip the other players with it as they run for the safety of a designated home base.

A modern variation of the game is geocaching, where participants are guided to the GPS coordinates of a hidden object in a public space, and must find it.

== Bibliography ==
- Alice Gomme, The Traditional Games of England, Scotland and Ireland (1894), republished by Thames & Hudson 1984
- Rosalie V. Halsey, Forgotten Books of the American Nursery (1911)
- Lydia Maria Child, The Girl's Own Book (1856)
- B. Sutton-Smith; B. G. Rosenberg, Sixty Years of Historical Change in the Game Preferences of American Children in The Journal of American Folklore Vol. 74, No. 291 (Jan., 1961), pp. 17–46
