= A Crack Up at the Race Riots =

Book by Harmony Korine

- Author: Harmony Korine
- Language: English
- Published: 1998 (Main Street Books)
- Publication place: United States
- Media type: Print (paperback)
- Pages: 192 pp
- ISBN: 0-385-48588-3
- OCLC: 37705311
- Dewey Decimal: 813/.54 21
- LC Class: PS3561.O658 C7 1998

A Crack Up at the Race Riots is a novel written by Harmony Korine, writer of such cult films as Kids and Gummo. The book was published in 1998 by Doubleday. A new edition was later published by Drag City.
