= American Thief =

2020 film directed by Miguel Silveira

- Theatrical Poster
- Directed by: Miguel Silveira
- Written by: Miguel Silveira; Michel Stolnicki; Missy Hernandez
- Produced by: Michel Stolnicki
- Starring: Xisko Maximo Monroe; Khadim Diop; Ben Becher; Josefina Scaro; Madeline McCray; Julia Morrison
- Cinematography: John Wakayma Carey
- Edited by: Avram Dodson
- Music by: Francis Rodriguez
- Release dates: September 18, 2020 (Oldenburg International Film Festival); January 10, 2021 (United States)
- Running time: 78 minutes
- Country: United States
- Language: English

American Thief is a 2020 action thriller film directed by Miguel Silveira. The film is about a teen hacker seeking revenge for his father's murder becomes a pawn in a plot to derail the 2016 presidential election. The film had its international premiere at the 2020 Oldenburg International Film Festival.

== Synopsis ==
Inspired by Haskell Wexler's seminal film Medium Cool, American Thief straddles fiction and documentary as its protagonists all become pawns in a plot to derail the 2016 presidential election. Filmed and scripted around true events between 2015 and 2019, American Thief is a fast-paced action/thriller that integrates fictional characters with real events, creating an atmosphere of uncertainty that seems all too familiar. Diop, a teenage hacker, wants to awaken society to the reality of overreaching government surveillance programs, while fellow-hacker Toncruz wants to use the technology to avenge his father's murder. As Toncruz connects with internet criminals on the deep web, Paul, a disgruntled vlogger, rants about political conspiracy theories. Both Paul and Toncruz are contacted by an Unidentified User who claims he can provide what is needed to expose the truth. Meanwhile, Josephina, an artificial intelligence programmer, observes what unfolds as she attempts to contain the monster she's created. An intense tale of dystopian conspiracy that will keep you transfixed.

== Cast ==
- Xisko Maximo Monroe – Toncruz
- Khadim Diop – Diop Mason
- Ben Becher – Paul Hunter
- Josefina Scaro – Josephine Aronovich
- Madeline McCray – Mrs. Mason
- Julia Morrison – Meeks
- Kai Monroe – Jimmorries
- Fernando Frias de la Parra – Rogue Systems Specialist
- Cacau Rosa – Claudia Jackson
- Johnny Ma – Hacker / Whistleblower

== Production ==
American Thief was shot between 2015 and 2020 in New York City and Washington DC. The film mixes documentary and fiction as it covers the events surrounding the election of Donald Trump in 2016. The film received the Jerome Foundation Production Grant.
