= Albert Deutsch =

American journalist and historian (1905–1961)

- Born: 23 October 1905; New York City, United States
- Died: 1961 (aged 55–56)
- Notable work: The Shame of the States

Albert Deutsch (1905–1961) was an American journalist and social historian. He received a George Polk Award for "Science Reporting" in 1948.

== Background ==
Albert Deutsch was born on October 23, 1905, on the lower East Side of New York City to immigrant parents from Latvia. He attended public schools but dropped out of high school.

== Career ==
After dropping out, he traveled for a number of years throughout the United States and supported himself by working as a longshoreman, a farm worker, and a shipyard worker. He continued to educate himself in biography and history by visiting public libraries.

He returned to New York City in the early 1930s. In 1934, he secured a position as an archivist-researcher with the New York State Department of Public Welfare, which was writing a history of the welfare period from 1867 to 1940. The book was published in 1942. While researching for this book, he found material about the public care of the mentally ill and he approached the National Foundation for Mental Health (part of the National Committee for Mental Hygiene) with a proposal to prepare a history of psychiatry in the United States. He proposed to co-author the book with Clifford Beers, Secretary of the National Committee for Mental Hygiene and the author of the acclaimed book The Mind that Found Itself, published in 1909. In the end, the book The Mentally Ill in America: A History of Their Care and Treatment from Colonial Times was published in 1937 with Deutsch the author.

Deutsch had a successful career as a social historian and as a journalist. From 1941 to 1947, he was a columnist for PM, writing on social aspects of health care. In 1948, he contributed to PM's successor, the short-lived New York Star.

Later, he published several books based on his columns. In 1945, he wrote about the care of veterans in the Veterans Administration hospitals. In 1948, his book The Shame of the States exposed the conditions in state mental hospitals. In 1950, he wrote Our Rejected Children, and in 1955, The Trouble with Cops. After the New York Star folded, he wrote briefly for the New York Post.

In 1945, he received the Heywood Broun award for his newspaper work. In 1947, the Newspaper Guild honored him as a distinguished humanitarian in American journalism. In 1948, he was elected to the Innominate Society. In 1949, he received the Lasker Award presented by the National Committee against Mental Illness. The American Psychiatric Association bestowed upon him an honorary membership in 1958.

In 1956, he received a grant from the National Association for Mental Health; later supplemented by funds from the National Institute of Mental Health to prepare a survey of mental health research in the United States.

== Death ==
Deutsch died June 18, 1961, in England while attending a conference hosted by the World Federation for Mental Health.

== Works ==
- Deutsch, Albert (1940). "The Convergence of Social Work and Psychiatry: An Historical Note". Mental Hygiene. 24: 92–97.
- Deutsch, Albert. “The History of Mental Hygiene,” in American Psychiatric Association's One Hundred Years of American Psychiatry (New York: Columbia University Press, 1944).
- Deutsch, Albert. “Military Psychiatry: The Civil War, 1861-65,” in American Psychiatric Association's One Hundred Years of American Psychiatry (New York: Columbia University Press, 1944).
- Deutsch, Albert. “Military Psychiatry: World War II, 1941-43,” in American Psychiatric Association's One Hundred Years of American Psychiatry (New York: Columbia University Press, 1944).
- Deutsch, Albert. Sex Habits of American Men: A Symposium on the Kinsey Report. New York: Prentice-Hall, 1948.
- Deutsch, Albert. The Shame of the States. New York: Harcourt, Brace, 1948.
- Deutsch, Albert. Our Rejected Children. Boston: Little, Brown, 1950.
- Deutsch, Albert. “Recent Trends in Mental Hospital Care,” Address given before the National Conference of Social Work in Atlantic City, N J, on April 26, 1950. Philadelphia, National Mental Health Foundation, 1950. Summary available in conference proceedings, pp. 275-276.
- Deutsch, Albert. “Tomorrow’s Challenges to the Medical Sciences: Report on a Conference of Medical Scientists and Corporation Executives Sponsored by the National Fund for Medical Education, the United States Steel Foundation, Inc., and the International Harvester Foundation at the University of Chicago, March 4, 1957.” New York, 1958.
- Deutsch, Albert, ed. The Encyclopedia of Mental Health. New York, 1963.
