= Harmony Korine =

American filmmaker and screenwriter (born 1973)

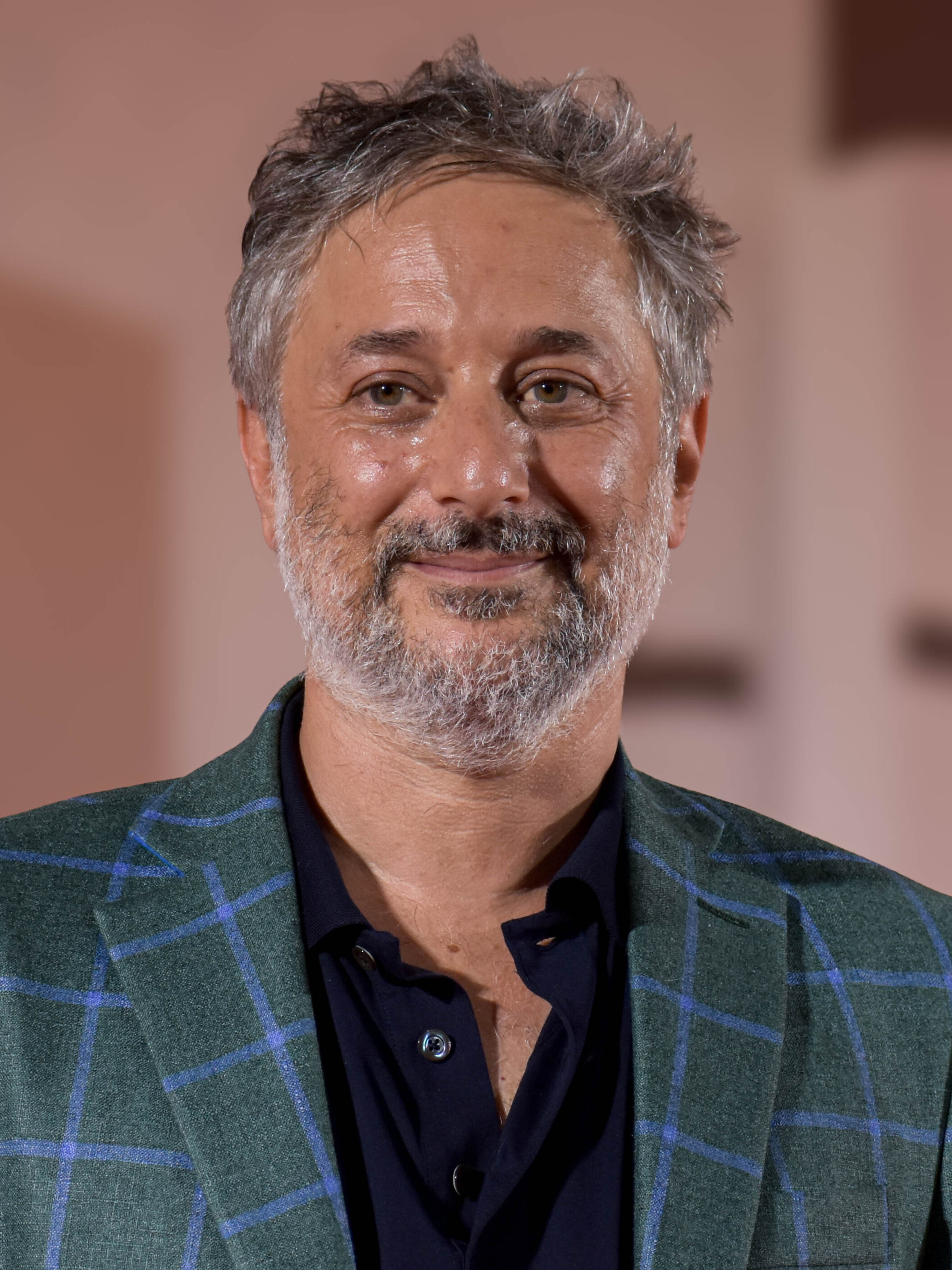
- Korine in 2024
- Born: January 4, 1973 (age 53); Bolinas, California, U.S.
- Occupations: Film director; film producer; screenwriter; actor; photographer; artist; author
- Years active: 1994–present
- Spouse: Rachel Korine (m. 2007, divorced)
- Children: 3

Harmony Korine (born January 4, 1973) is an American filmmaker, actor, photographer, artist, and author. His methods feature an erratic, loose and transgressive aesthetic, exploring taboo themes and incorporating experimental techniques, and works with art, music, fashion and advertising.

Korine's career began when he wrote the screenplay for the Larry Clark film Kids (1995), which was followed by his directorial debut, Gummo (1997), and its follow up Julien Donkey-Boy (1999). His films typically explore unconventional narratives and themes of dysfunctional families, and also include Mister Lonely (2007), Spring Breakers (2012), and The Beach Bum (2019).

Korine founded EDGLRD, a creative and technology company, in 2023, with his film Aggro Dr1ft (2023) being one of the company's first projects.

== Early life ==
Korine was born on January 4, 1973, in Bolinas, California. He is the son of Eve and Sol Korine and was raised Sephardic Jewish. His father was an Iranian Jewish immigrant. His father was a tapdancer and produced documentaries for PBS in the 1970s about an "array of colorful Southern characters"; he would take Korine to carnivals and circuses and taught him how to use a Bolex camera. As a child, Korine watched movies with his father, who rented Buster Keaton films for Korine and took him to see Werner Herzog's Even Dwarfs Started Small (1970) in the theater. Korine reminisced that "I knew there was a poetry in cinema that I had never seen before that was so powerful."

Korine spent his early childhood in the San Francisco Bay Area living with his family on a commune. In the early 1980s, they relocated to Nashville, Tennessee, where he attended Hillsboro High School before moving to New York City to live with his grandmother. As a teenager, Korine spent his summers in San Francisco, "skateboarding, living on rooftops, running away from my parents, getting in fights. You know, girls. At that point I was just getting into movies, but the idea of making films happened later in high school." He began frequenting revival theaters, watching films by John Cassavetes, Werner Herzog, Jean-Luc Godard, Robert Altman, Rainer Werner Fassbinder and Alan Clarke. In an interview with Bruce LaBruce, Korine briefly mentioned that he studied business administration in college. Other sources state that he studied Dramatic Writing at Tisch School of the Arts at New York University for one semester before dropping out to pursue a career as a professional skateboarder.

== Career ==
=== Kids and Gummo (1994–1998) ===
Korine was skating with friends in Washington Square Park when he met photographer Larry Clark. Impressed, the photographer asked him to compose a script about skaters and to include in the plot a teenage AIDS experience. Korine told Clark, "I've been waiting all my life to write this story." Within three weeks, Korine wrote Kids, a film about 24 hours in the sex- and drug-filled lives of several Manhattan teenagers in New York City during the AIDS crisis. Kids received mixed reviews at the time of its release in 1995, but has since become a significant cult film. Among others, the film features Chloë Sevigny and Rosario Dawson in their first movie roles. The film, while controversial, jumpstarted Korine's career. This put him into contact with film producer Cary Woods who budgeted about $1 million to produce Gummo, Korine's personal vision.

In 1997, Korine wrote and directed Gummo, a film based on life in Xenia, Ohio, a town devastated by a tornado in the early 1970s. Forgoing conventional narrative, Gummo is a nonlinear, fragmented series of sketches written by Korine. Only five experienced actors worked on the movie; much of the cast was found during preproduction in Tennessee. The film is notable for having unsettling, often bizarre scenes, as well as its dreamlike soundtrack, which strengthens the disconcerting atmosphere. It features an eclectic soundtrack including black metal, Madonna and Roy Orbison.

It premiered at the 24th Telluride Film Festival on August 29, 1997. During the screening, numerous people got up and left during the initial cat drowning sequence. Three months later, Werner Herzog called Korine to give praise to the film overall, especially the bacon taped to the wall during the bathtub scene. He told The New York Times, "When I saw a piece of fried bacon fixed to the bathroom wall in Gummo, it knocked me off my chair. [Korine's] a very clear voice of a generation of filmmakers that is taking a new position. It's not going to dominate world cinema, but so what?"

Although a majority of mainstream critics derided it as an unintelligible mess, it won top prizes at that year's Venice Film Festival and earned Korine the respect of noted filmmakers such as Gus Van Sant, among others. It has been called "unlike anything you've seen in a while – maybe ever" – and that "if you're the kind of person who claims to be frustrated by the predictability of commercial filmmaking, [it presents] a rare opportunity to put your money where your mouth is."

In 1998, Korine released The Diary of Anne Frank Pt II, a 40-minute three-screen collage featuring a boy burying his dog, kids in satanic dress vomiting on a Bible, and a man in blackface dancing and singing "My Bonnie Lies over the Ocean". It uses some of the same actors and themes as Gummo, and can be considered a companion piece as the film utilises footage that didn't make the final cut of Gummo. The film "further disgusted critics" and solidified his status as a notoriously shocking and experimental director.

=== Julien Donkey-Boy and Ken Park (1999–2003) ===
Julien Donkey-Boy, released in 1999, included a signed Dogme 95 manifesto. While it broke a number of the movement's basic tenets, Lars von Trier lauded Korine's ability to interpret the rules creatively. The story is told from the perspective of a young man suffering from untreated schizophrenia, played by Ewen Bremner, as he tries to understand his deteriorating world. Julien's abusive and arguably hypersensitive father is played by Werner Herzog. At one point, Korine was to play the son, but he backed down and was replaced by Bremner. Like Gummo and Kids, it too has since become something of a cult classic, a go-to film for those seeking cinema that is, as Roger Ebert said in his three star review, "shocking for most moviegoers", unlike "the slick aboveground indie productions" that are now the norm.

In 2000, The Devil, The Sinner, and His Journey premiered, which featured Korine in black metal corpsepaint as O. J. Simpson and Johnny Depp as Kato Kaelin. That same year, Korine directed the short film Korine Tap for Stop For a Minute, a series of short films commissioned by Dazed & Confused magazine and FilmFour Lab. The film featured Korine tap dancing while wearing blackface.

In 2002, Larry Clark made Ken Park, based on a script Korine had written several years earlier. The film, another adult tale of youth gone awry, was not distributed in the United States. At the time of its release, Clark and Korine had long since parted ways, and Korine had no involvement in its production.

In 2003, he made the television documentary Above the Below about his friend and collaborator David Blaine and his 44-day stunt in a park over the bank of River Thames in London inside a suspended plexiglas box. A documentary commissioned by Sky Television and Channel 4, it also includes jokes, visual poetry, and music. In addition, Korine has worked with Blaine on a number of Blaine's specials.

=== Mister Lonely and Trash Humpers (2007–2009) ===
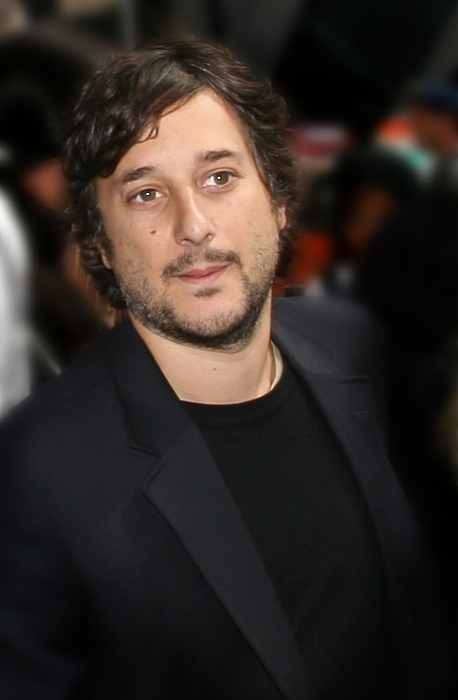
Korine in 2007

His third feature film, Mister Lonely, was co-written by his brother Avi Korine, and starred Diego Luna, Samantha Morton, Denis Lavant, Anita Pallenberg, David Blaine, Werner Herzog, and Mal Whiteley. The movie was released in 2008 and debuted at Cannes. His most expensive film, with a budget of $8.2 million, it received mixed reviews and earned $386,915 in its first 9 months. It follows the story of a young American who scratches out a living performing in public places as a Michael Jackson look-alike, and connects with an assortment of other celebrity impersonators in a commune, who build a stage in the hope that the world will visit and watch them perform.

Korine also appeared in the 2007 documentary film Beautiful Losers in which his life and career were one focus of the film, along with other artists such as Mike Mills, Shepard Fairey, Margaret Kilgallen, Jo Jackson and Barry McGee. In the documentary, Korine discusses his motivation as an artist and filmmaker, as well as his inspiration for creating films he has never seen. Footage also appears from one of Korine's rare, early, and untitled short films, which preceded his work on Kids.

In 2008 Korine was signed to MJZ for worldwide commercial representation.

On 6 September 2009 Korine's film Trash Humpers premiered as part of the Visions section of the 2009 Toronto International Film Festival. Despite being a work of fiction, the film went on to win the top award at the prominent European documentary film festival CPH:DOX – [[Copenhagen International Documentary Festival]] – in November 2009.

In March 2011, Korine released a short film entitled Umshini Wam, which is a popular Zulu struggle song meaning "bring me my machine gun". The film starred Ninja and Yo-Landi of Die Antwoord. In September 2011, Korine released a short film entitled Snowballs, sponsored by the Proenza Schouler fashion label.

=== Spring Breakers and The Beach Bum (2012–2019) ===
Korine's next project was the crime drama Spring Breakers, which was produced in 2012 in Florida, and starred James Franco, Selena Gomez, Vanessa Hudgens, Ashley Benson, and Korine's wife, Rachel Korine. In looking at early scenes being filmed and in speaking toward the plot, cast, and earlier works of the filmmaker, Indiewire wrote "this might be the weirdest movie the director has ever made simply by nature of being totally unlike his previous work." "That Mr. Korine appears to be having it both (or many) ways may seem like a cop-out, but only if you believe that the role of the artist is to be a didact or a scold", wrote The New York Times. Principal filming wrapped up on March 30, 2012. The film was selected to compete for the Golden Lion at the 69th Venice International Film Festival. where it had its world premiere, and later was shown at the Toronto International Film Festival before being released to the general public in March 2013.

Korine's feature The Beach Bum was released in 2019, starring Matthew McConaughey as Moondog, Isla Fisher as his wife Minnie, Martin Lawrence as Captain Wack, and Snoop Dogg as Lingerie.

=== Aggro Dr1ft and other EDGLRD projects (2023–present) ===
In 2023, Korine released Aggro Dr1ft starring Catalan actor Jordi Mollà and rapper Travis Scott. The film premiered at the 80th Venice International Film Festival, and was produced and distributed by his company EDGLRD.

The next year, Korine directed Baby Invasion, also with EDGLRD, and was shot from a first-person perspective.

In November 2026, Korine directed a short film starring Mariah Carey for Gucci's holiday campaign, with creative direction by Demna. Set in a hotel preparing for Carey's arrival, the film featured her song "All I Want for Christmas Is You".

== Artistry and reception ==
=== Style and aesthetic ===
Korine has not primarily regarded himself as a director, instead describing a "unified aesthetic" that his filmography explores as much as his art and photography. Much of his filmography, including his screenplays, explores themes of dysfunctional families, mental disorders, abuse, hedonism, poverty and various subcultures, with unreliable narrators and a collage of perspectives. This is often presented experimentally, with many of Korine's films incorporating Polaroids, Super 8, 35mm film and VHS recordings, such as in Gummo and Julien Donkey-Boy. Improvisation is also an important filmmaking technique for Korine, as a way to maintain his films as "living thing[s]." Korine has described the social, psychological and subcultural aspects of his films as constituting what he describes as the "American Landscape".

Korine credited tap-dance, vaudeville and minstrelsy as influences on his work in the 1990s and 2000s, with him especially naming the comedy of Fanny Brice, Eddie Cantor and Al Jolson as inspirations for his intentionally stilted style of presentation and humor. Like vaudeville, the style of Korine's work is presentational and works purely by thematic association. He has compared with this to viewing picture books of assorted photos, which would be seemingly devoid of context, but because they are compiled and presented in succession, a narrative is formed, and Korine has said that Gummo and his subsequent films were written in this fashion, striving to retain a "margin of the undefined." In 2009, he summarized an ideal setting in his aesthetic as "an abandoned parking lot and a soiled sofa on the edge [...] with a street lamp off to the side. America seems like a series of abandoned parking lots, streetlights and abandoned sofas." Ensuing from this, the setting appears frequently in his film Trash Humpers (2009).

His recent works with EDGLRD are noted for their heavy use of generative AI visuals.

=== Influences ===
In 1997, Korine's favorite writers were listed as the humorists James Thurber and S. J. Perelman, as well as the Southern Gothic novelist Flannery O'Connor. He also credited the philosopher Walter Benjamin as an influence. In recent years, Korine has praised rapper and collaborator Gucci Mane.

Korine has noted British filmmaker Alan Clarke as a strong inspiration on his filmmaking, especially with regards to his realism and use of extensive scenes. In 1999, he listed his top ten films as Pixote by Héctor Babenco, Badlands and Days of Heaven by Terrence Malick, Fat City by John Huston, Stroszek by Werner Herzog, The Killing of a Chinese Bookie and A Woman Under the Influence by John Cassavetes, McCabe and Mrs. Miller by Robert Altman, Out of the Blue by Dennis Hopper and Hail Mary by Jean-Luc Godard.

In recent years, Korine has drastically moved away from cinematic inspiration and towards internet inspiration, claiming that "IShowSpeed is a movie, Kai Cenat is a movie," and calling IShowSpeed "the new Tarkovsky."

=== Criticism and praise ===
Despite the scorn of a majority of mainstream reviewers, Korine has won festival prizes at Venice and Rotterdam among others. Established directors such as Bernardo Bertolucci and Gus Van Sant are also outspoken proponents of Korine's work, with Van Sant saying Gummo "changed his life" and Bertolucci saying Korine "created a revolution in the language of cinema."

Korine was initially frequently labeled as an enfant terrible and was often accused of exploitation and self-indulgence; he responded in 1997, asking "How can an artist be expected not to be self-indulgent? That's the whole thing that's wrong with filmmaking today [...] To me, art is one man's voice, one idea, one point-of-view, coming from one person." Korine feels there is no need to justify or explain the images he puts to the screen, clarifying that they are simply the result of "a cinema of passion and obsession." He has added that "I mostly just make things to entertain myself and at the same time hope that there's some type of audience that likes what I'm doing." Korine has also stated that "film is like a dead art because of people not taking chances", and has shown his preference for "auteurist works". He stated in 1999 that "In another ten or fifteen years, the people that understand and appreciate Gummo or my work will be in positions of power", declaring that the culture presented in his art was going to become more prominent.

Korine has said that his films are created with the premise that if there is at least one image that sticks with you after viewing a film and makes you change your perspective on cinema, then it is a success. Roger Ebert subsequently said in his review of Julien Donkey-Boy that "Korine, who at 25 is one of the most untamed new directors, belongs on the list with Godard, Cassavetes, Herzog, Warhol, Tarkovsky, Brakhage and others who smash conventional movies and reassemble the pieces ... Harmony Korine is the real thing, an innovative and gifted filmmaker whose work forces us to see on his terms."

== Other ventures ==
=== Books ===
Korine has published a number of books. A Crack Up at the Race Riots, an experimental book of fragments which he jokingly described in press appearances and interviews as his attempt to write "the Great American Choose Your Own Adventure novel", was published in 1998 by Drag City.

The screenplay for Kids (1995) was published by Grove Press the same year, followed by a collection of the screenplays for Gummo (1997), Julien Donkey-Boy (1999) and an unfinished screenplay named Jokes in Collected Screenplays, published by Faber and Faber in 2002. The screenplay for Mister Lonely (2007) was released by Swiss publisher Nieves with photographs by Rachel Korine and Brent Stewart in 2008. The majority of these books differ substantially from the movies eventually produced. Drag City also published a collection of his fanzines called The Collected Fanzines with skateboarder and writer Mark Gonzales in 2008.

=== Art ===
Korine released a number of photographic collections, usually in conjunction with gallery exhibits. In 1998 he published The Bad Son in conjunction with Taka Ishii gallery in Tokyo, documenting his various photo shoots with Macaulay Culkin. In 2002, Pass the Bitch Chicken was released, a collaboration with artist Christopher Wool, which consists of Korine's photographs heavily edited by Korine and Wool. In 2009 he published Pigxote in conjunction with the Vanderbilt University Fine Arts Gallery and released by Nieves. The university describes the exhibition, which ran through February 26, 2009, as culling "together a number of photographs from Korine's private files in order to reveal a side of the artist's creative process that remains largely unexamined. Depicting an unnamed, mysterious young girl moving through a televised landscape of shifting contexts, Pigxote further illustrates Korine's interest in replacing plot lines and expected narrative tropes with intuitively arranged "experiential moments." They also provide a unique insight into the poetic mind of Nashville's most compelling prodigal son." In 2003 his works were presented at an exhibition at agnès b's Galerie du jour in Paris, with whom Korine has often been associated. In 2010, Korine collaborated with New York Visual Artist Bill Saylor on the book Ho Bags. The book consists of drawing and paintings in which Korine and Saylor drew over each other's works. In 2011 Korine collaborated with the New York brand Supreme, releasing a set of two skateboard decks featuring original artworks by Korine. Since 2014, Korine has taken part in twelve exhibitions at the Gagosian gallery in various locations, including New York, London, Beverly Hills and Geneva. Seven of these have been solo exhibitions. In 2019 the Gagosian featured a collection of works by Korine titled "Young Twitchy". These works consisted of photographs taken by the artist, mostly around his home in Florida, which were then recreated in oil paint and augmented with different characters. In 2023, The Golfer's Journal featured a collection of works by Korine titled "Wormburner", consisting of portraits of U.S. Presidents playing golf.

=== Commercials ===
Korine directed a commercial for Dior Addict Fragrance in 2014. In February 2020, Korine directed and photographed a Gucci tailoring campaign starring Tyler, the Creator, A$AP Rocky and Iggy Pop. In 2021, Korine directed a commercial for 7-Eleven featuring the song "Fred Sanford" by hip hop duo Marlowe, which subsequently went viral.

=== Music ===
Korine has directed a number of music videos for artists such as Sonic Youth, Will Oldham, Cat Power and the Black Keys. In addition, he sang on Oldham's Ease Down The Road (2001). In 1999 Korine and Brian Degraw of Gang Gang Dance released a one-off album, SSAB Songs. He also co-authored the lyrics of Björk's "Harm of Will" from her album Vespertine (2001), and co-wrote Lana Del Rey's "Florida Kilos" which is featured on the deluxe edition of her album Ultraviolence (2014).

Korine directed the music video for Rihanna's "Needed Me" which was released on April 21, 2016. In the same year, Korine directed a Supreme commercial starring rapper Gucci Mane (who had previously appeared in Spring Breakers), and appeared in the music video for Gucci Mane and Travis Scott's "Last Time".

Korine directed the music video for Bladee's "ONE SECOND" featuring Yung Lean, which was released on April 27, 2024, in collaboration with EDGLRD.

=== EDGLRD ===
Korine founded EDGLRD, a creative and technology company, in 2023. The company is based in Miami, Florida.

== Personal life ==
Korine met Chloë Sevigny in Washington Square Park in New York City during her senior year of high school in 1993. The two became close friends, which resulted in her being cast in the low-budget independent film Kids (1995). They had a romantic relationship that ended in the early 2000s though they are still friends. He was married to former actress Rachel Korine, with whom he has three children. A 2025 article in Interview reported that they were no longer married.

In 2009, Korine received criticism for signing a petition in support of film director Roman Polanski, calling for his release after Polanski was arrested in Switzerland in relation to his 1977 charge for drugging and raping a 13-year-old girl.

== Filmography ==
=== Feature films ===
Key
†	Denotes films that have not yet been released

Year	Title	Director	Writer	Notes
1995	Kids	No	Yes	
1997	Gummo	Yes	Yes	
1999	Julien Donkey-Boy	Yes	Yes	
2002	Ken Park	No	Yes	
2007	Mister Lonely	Yes	Yes	Co-written with Avi Korine, Also Producer
2009	Trash Humpers	Yes	Yes	Also cinematographer
2012	Spring Breakers	Yes	Yes	
2019	The Beach Bum	Yes	Yes	
2023	Aggro Dr1ft	Yes	Yes	
2024	Baby Invasion	Yes	Yes	

=== Unfinished and unreleased projects ===
- Untitled hidden camera film (1997)
- Fight Harm (1999)
- Untitled tap dance film (1999)
- Jokes (anthology film, 2000) with Gus Van Sant
- The Grace of Blackface (2000)
- Untitled period drama about the history of molestation in the Boy Scouts (2000)
- Mitch Poppins (short film, early 2000s) with Chris Cunningham
- What Makes Pistachio Nuts (2000s)
- The Diaper of Big Baby Jesus (novel, 2007)
- Below the Waist, Above the Ankles (2008)
- Twinkle Twinkle (2010) starring Marlon Wayans
- The Trap (2015–17) starring Idris Elba, Benicio Del Toro, Robert Pattinson, Al Pacino and James Franco
- Untitled Scarecrow-esque screenplay (2016)
- A film adaptation of Alissa Nutting's novel Tampa (2016)
- Untitled Beach Bum spin-off (2019)
- Potential remakes of Porky's, Smokey and the Bandit, Police Academy 2 and Cocoon (2019)
- Untitled Terrence Malick screenplay (2023)

=== Miscellaneous credits ===
- The Devil, the Sinner, and His Journey (1998, short)
- The Diary of Anne Frank Pt II (1998, exhibition)
- Korine Tap (2000, short)
- Above the Below (2003, TV documentary)
- Mac and Plac (2010, short)
- Blood of Havana (2010, short)
- Act Da Fool (2010, short)
- 42 One Dream Rush (2010, anthology film, segment "Crutchnap")
- Curb Dance (2011, short)
- Umshini Wam (2011, short)
- Rebel (2011, exhibition, segment "Caput")
- Snowballs (2011, short)
- The Fourth Dimension (2012, anthology film, segment "Lotus Community Workshop")
- Alone in the Woods: The Legend of Cambo (2015, short)
- Circus Maximus (2023, music-video film, segment "Pompeii")

=== Acting credits ===
- Kids (1995) – Fidget
- Good Will Hunting (1997) – Jerve
- Gummo (1997) – Boy on Couch
- Last Days (2005) – Guy in Club
- Trash Humpers (2009) – Hervé
- Stoker (2013) – Mr. Feldman
- Manglehorn (2014) – Gary
- The Girlfriend Experience (2nd season, 2017) - Paul
- Mid90s (2018) – Todd
- Waves (2019) – Mr. Stanley

Self

- Fight Harm (unfinished, 1999)
- The Name of This Film Is Dogme95 (2000)
- Beautiful Losers (2008)
- Until the Light Takes Us (2008)
- Durch die Nacht mit ... (translation, Into the Night with... 2010)
- Sleepless Night Stories (2011)
- The Advocate for Fagdom (2011)
