= Paranormal television =

Genre of reality television

Paranormal television is a genre of reality television that purports to document factual investigations of the paranormal rather than fictional representations seen in traditional narrative films and TV. Over the years, the genre has grown to be a staple of television and even changed the programming focus of networks like the History Channel and the Travel Channel. By highlighting beliefs in topics ranging from Bigfoot to aliens, paranormal television continues to elevate popular interest in the paranormal.

== History ==
=== Early precursors (1950s–1999) ===
Accounts of supernatural occurrences have always been common in the print media. The 1705 pamphlet "A True Relation of the Apparition of One Mrs Veal" by Daniel Defoe is a well-known example. Paranormal television proper can trace its genesis to local TV news programs in the UK and US, which have featured ghost stories since the 1960s. The earliest TV show devoted exclusively to the paranormal was One Step Beyond which broadcast 96 episodes on the ABC network from 1959 to 1961. The stories were promoted as being based on actual real-life experiences, including historically well-known events such as sinking of RMS Titanic, the 1906 San Francisco earthquake, and the assassination of Abraham Lincoln.

It was followed 15 years later by In Search of..., hosted by Leonard Nimoy which ran for six years from 1977 to 1982. Rod Serling was originally slated to host the series, but he died in 1975. In Search of... explored many paranormal topics, including UFOs, cryptozoological creatures (cryptids), lost civilizations, and other mysteries. Though the subject matter gradually lost popularity, the show gave way to future TV series following the same genre.

Unsolved Mysteries, which began airing in 1987 and ended in 2002, would feature paranormal cases from time to time, and further popularised the documentary aspect of paranormal television. Ghostwatch, a fictional news broadcast about a haunted house in the UK that aired in 1992, created controversy when a majority of viewers believed the televised show was real. Discovery Channel started to explore the genre with some success from 1996. The Fox Broadcasting Company aired a news-style oriented show Sightings which lasted for six years.

=== Reality Television (2000–present) ===
In 2000, MTV's Fear premiered, merging nascent reality television with the storytelling of traditional horror films. The innovative show established the visual look, music and editing style of the paranormal reality television genre; most iconically, the format of investigators filming themselves with portable cameras as they become frightened exploring dark, unnerving environments. By the end of 2000, shows inspired by MTV's Fear began production for a growing range of networks, starting with Fox Family's Scariest Places on Earth, followed by Murder in Small Town X in 2001, Scare Tactics in 2003. To-date, the genre has grown into a staple of television.

Ghost Hunters premiered in 2004 on Sci Fi (later Syfy) Sci Fi broadened into other paranormal shows, including Destination Truth. Ghost Adventures, another ghost-hunting program, which premiered on the Discovery Networks-owned Travel Channel in 2008, was the successor to a documentary film of the same name that aired on Sci Fi in 2007. A&E aired the prominent ghost-hunting series Paranormal State from 2007 to 2011, and History Channel began to compete in the general paranormal genre around this time with series such as UFO Files, MonsterQuest, UFO Hunters and the documentary special Ancient Aliens, which led to a successor series that began airing in 2010.

Syfy abandoned their focus on paranormal programming by 2015, and Ghost Hunters itself left the network in 2016 after 11 seasons. Around that time, Travel Channel moved completely into airing exclusively paranormal television series (the network initially centering programming around Ghost Adventures) frequently featuring ghost hunting, including series related to Ghost Adventures, as well as later productions featuring former Ghost Hunters members such as Kindred Spirits (2014–present) and Ghost Nation (2019–2021). Destination America planned to compete with Travel Channel's paranormal programming (seasons 1-2 of Kindred Spirits aired on DA and TLC), but reversed course after it and TLC were reacquired by Discovery Networks during their acquisition of Scripps Networks Interactive in 2018. In 2019, Ghost Hunters was revived by A&E and aired a 12th season on the channel with a 13th season coming in 2020.

=== Reactions/critics ===
Noting the recent trend in reality shows that take the paranormal at face value, The New York Times Culture editor Mike Hale characterized ghost hunting shows as "pure theater" and compared the genre to professional wrestling or soft core pornography for its formulaic, teasing approach.

Los Angeles Times staff writer Ed Stockly wrote that "the paranormal/supernatural-investigation subgenre that has cropped up on cable television over the last few years, which includes Ghost Hunters, Destination Truth, Ghost Adventures, Ghost Hunters International and a few others" promises to "take a skeptical approach in its investigations and to rely on science to confirm or disprove paranormal claims. So far not one has been able to consistently keep that promise."

Writer Diane Dorby proposes that paranormal reality TV shows provide "plausibility structures" that people use for "interpreting the meaning and experience of death".

According to science writer Sharon A. Hill, "paranormal reality TV shows are designed as entertainment for the curious, not science documentaries to discover truths. If the tempo is too slow it will be sped up by giving 'reality' a boost".

== Programs ==
Program	Original run (years; premiere–finale)	Category	Format	Original channel/network
6ixth Sense	2002–2003	Psychics		Living TV (UK)
10 Million Dollar Bigfoot Bounty	2014	Cryptozoology	Reality	Spike
13: Fear Is Real	2009	Paranormal	Reality	CW
A Haunting	2002, 2005–2007, 2012–2019	Ghosts	Anthology	Discovery Channel
Alien Encounters	2013	UFOs–aliens		Science Channel
Alien Mysteries	2013	UFOs–aliens	Documentary	Discovery Channel (Canada)
America's Psychic Challenge	2007	Psychics	Competitive reality	Lifetime
America Unearthed	2012–2015, 2019	Conspiracy		History
Ancient Aliens	2009–present	UFOs–aliens	Documentary	History
Ancient Mysteries	1994–1998	Paranormal		A&E
Ancient Secrets	2012			National Geographic Channel
Ancient X-Files	2010	Paranormal		National Geographic Channel
Animal X	2014	Cryptozoology	Documentary	Discovery Channel
The Antiques Ghost Show	2003	Ghosts	Reality	Living TV (UK)
Arthur C. Clarke's Mysterious Universe	1995	Paranormal		ITV (UK)
Arthur C. Clarke's Mysterious World	1980	Paranormal		ITV (UK)
Arthur C. Clarke's World of Strange Powers	1985	Paranormal		ITV (UK)
Beast Hunter	2011	Cryptozoology		National Geographic Channel
Beyond	2005–2007	Paranormal	Documentary	Canada
Beyond Belief: Fact or Fiction	1997–2002	Paranormal	Anthology	Fox
Beyond Reason	1977–1980	Paranormal	Quiz show	CBC Television (Canada)
Brad Meltzer's Decoded	2010–2012	Conspiracy	Investigation	History
Celebrity Ghost Stories	2009–2014	Ghosts	Reality	Biography Channel
Celebrity Paranormal Project	2006–2007	Ghosts	Reality	VH1
Chills	2012		Investigation	(UK)
Conjuring Kesha	2022			
Conspiracy Theory with Jesse Ventura	2009–2011	Conspiracy		TruTV
Creepy Canada	2002–2006	Paranormal		OLN (Canada)
Critical Eye	2002	Paranormal		Science Channel
Crossing Over with John Edward	1999–2004	Psychic		SyFy
Cuarto Milenio	2005			Cuatro (TV channel) (SPA)
The Curse of Oak Island	2014 – present	Pseudo–archaeology	Reality	History (Canadian TV network)
Dark Matters: Twisted But True	2011–2012	Paranormal		Science
Dead Famous	2004–2006	Ghosts	Reality	Living TV (UK)
The Dead Files	2011–present	Psychics		Travel Channel
Deadly Possessions	2016–	Paranormal		Travel Channel
Decoding the Past	2005–2008	Paranormal		History
Deep South Paranormal	2010–2013	Paranormal		Syfy
Derek Acorah's Ghost Towns	2005–2006	Ghosts	Reality	Living TV (UK)
Destination Fear	2012	Paranormal	Reality/prank	Travel Channel
Destination Fear	2019	Paranormal	Reality	Travel Channel
Destination Truth	2007–2012	Paranormal	Reality	Syfy
Encounters: The Hidden Truth	1994–1996	Paranormal	news/documentary	Fox
Enigma	2005	Paranormal	documentary	Vision TV (Canada)
The Extraordinary	1993–1996	Paranormal	Documentary	Seven Network (Australia)
Extreme Ghost Stories	2006–2007	Ghosts	Documentary	ITV1 (UK)
Extreme Paranormal	2009	Ghosts	Documentary	A&E
Fact or Faked: Paranormal Files	2010–2012	Paranormal	Investigation	Syfy
MTV's Fear	2000–2001	Paranormal		MTV
Finding Bigfoot	2011–2018	Cryptozoology	Documentary	Animal Planet
Fortean TV	1997–1998	Paranormal	Documentary	Channel 4 (UK)
Ghost Adventures	2008–present	Ghosts		Travel Channel
Ghost Adventures: Aftershocks	2014	Ghosts	Documentary	Travel Channel
Ghost Asylum	2014–2016	Paranormal	Reality	Destination America
Ghost Brothers	2016	Paranormal	Reality	Destination America
Ghost Hunt	2005–2006	Ghost	Reality	TV2 (New Zealand) (New Zealand)
Ghost Hunters	2004–2016, 2019–present	Ghosts	Reality	Sci Fi Channel
Ghost Hunters Academy	2009–2010	Ghost	Reality	Syfy
Ghost Hunters International	2008–2012	Ghost	Reality	Syfy
Ghost Lab	2009–2011	Ghosts		Discovery Channel
Ghost Mine	2013	Ghost	Reality	Syfy
Ghost Nation	2019–present	Ghosts	Reality	Travel Channel
Ghost Stalkers	2014	Paranormal	Reality	Destination America
Ghost Stories	2009–2010	Ghosts		Travel Channel
Ghost Trackers	2005–2008	Ghosts	Reality	YTV (Canada)
Ghosthunters	1996–1997	Ghosts	Documentary	Discovery Channel Europe (UK)
Ghosthunting With...	2006–2011	Ghosts		ITV2 (UK)
Ghostly Encounters	2005–2011	Ghosts	Documentary	Viva/W Network (Canada)
Ghosts	2019	Ghosts		BBC One
The Girly Ghosthunters	2005	Ghosts		Space (Canada)
Great British Ghosts	2011–2012	Ghosts		Yesterday (UK)
Hangar 1: The UFO Files	2014–2015	UFOs–aliens	Documentary	H2
The Haunted	2009–2011	Ghosts	Anthology	Animal Planet
Haunted Collector	2011–2013	Ghosts	Documentary	Syfy
Haunted Discoveries	2023	Paranormal	Documentary	T+E
Haunted Encounters	2012	Paranormal	Reality	Biography Channel
Haunted Highway	2012–2013	Paranormal	Investigation	Syfy
Haunted History	1998–2001	Ghosts	Documentary	History Channel; Biography Channel
Haunted History	2013	Paranormal	Documentary	H2
Haunted Homes	2004–2010	Ghosts	Reality	ITV (UK)
Haunted Hotels	2001–2005	Ghosts	Reality	Travel Channel
Haunted Lives: True Ghost Stories	1991–1995	Ghosts	Anthology	CBS, UPN
Haunted Towns	2017–present	Paranormal	Reality	Destination America
Haunted USA	2017	Paranormal	Reality	Travel Channel
The Haunting of...	2012–2016	Ghosts	Documentary	Biography Channel; LMN
Haunting: Australia	2014	Paranormal	Reality	Syfy
Haunting Evidence	2005–2008	Paranormal	Documentary	Court tv
The Haunting of...	2012–2016	Paranormal	Documentary	Biography Channel
History's Mysteries	1998–2006	Paranormal	Documentary	History
Hunting Hitler	2015 – 2018, 2020	Conspiracy	Investigation	History
I Was Possessed	2015	Paranormal	Reality	LMN
I'm Famous and Frightened!	2004–2005	Ghosts	Reality	Living TV (UK)
In Search of...	1976–1982	Paranormal	Documentary	Syndication
In Search of Aliens	2014	UFOs–aliens		H2
Is It Real?	2005–2007	Paranormal		National Geographic Channel
It's a Miracle	1998–2004	Miracles		Ion Television
Joe Rogan Questions Everything	2013	Paranormal		Syfy
John Edward Cross Country	2006–2008	Psychic		WE tv
Khon Uad Phee	2010–present	Ghosts	Variety talk show	Channel 7 Channel 5 (Thailand)
Killer Contact	2013	Paranormal		SyFy
Kindred Spirits	2016–present	Paranormal	Reality	TLC
Knock Knock Ghost	2016–present	Paranormal	Reality	OutTV (Canada)
Lawrence Leung's Unbelievable	2011	Paranormal	Comedy	ABC1 (Australia)
Legend Quest	2011	Paranormal	Live action	SyFy
Leap in the Dark	1973, 1975, 1977, 1980	Paranormal	Anthology / Documentary	BBC Two (UK)
Living with the Dead	2008–2009	Ghosts		Living (UK)
Long Island Medium	2011–2019	Psychic	Reality	TLC (TV network)
Megalodon: The Monster Shark Lives	2013		pseudo–documentary	Animal Planet
Mermaids: The Body Found	2011		pseudo–documentary	Animal Planet
Monica the Medium	2015	Psychic	Reality	ABC Family
MonsterQuest	2007–2010	Cryptozoology	Documentary	History
Monsters and Mysteries in America	2013–2015	Cryptozoology	Documentary	Destination America
Most Haunted	2002–2010, 2014–2019	Ghosts	Reality	Living (UK); Paranormal Channel (UK); Travel Channel (US); Really (TV channel) (UK)
Most Haunted Live!	2002–2010	Ghosts	Reality	Living TV (UK); Paranormal Channel (UK); Travel Channel (US)
Most Terrifying Places in America	2009–2010	Paranormal	Documentary	Travel Channel
Mountain Monsters	2013	Cryptozoology	Documentary	Destination America
Mostly True Stories?: Urban Legends Revealed	2002–2004	Urban legends	Documentary	TLC
MTV's Fear	2000–2002	Ghosts	Reality	MTV
My Ghost Story	2010–2013	Ghosts		Biography Channel; LMN
Mysteries at the Museum	2010–present	Paranormal		Travel Channel
Mysteries at the National Parks	2015	Paranormal	Reality	Travel Channel
Mysterious Journeys	2002–2007	Paranormal		Travel Channel
Mystery Hunters	2002–2009	Skeptical, Paranormal	Documentary	YTV
Mystery Hunters India	2012–2014	Paranormal	Documentary	Discovery Kids (Asia; India)
MysteryQuest	2009	Paranormal		History
The Next Step Beyond	1978–1979	Paranormal		Syndication
Northern Mysteries	2005	Paranormal	Docudrama	Global Television Network
Nostradamus Effect	2009	Psychics		History
The One	2008–2011	Psychics	Competitive reality	Seven Network (Australia)
One Step Beyond	1959–1961	Paranormal	Anthology	ABC
The Othersiders	2009	Ghosts	Reality	Cartoon Network
Paranormal?	2005	Paranormal	Documentary	National Geographic Channel
Paranormal Challenge	2011	Paranormal	Competitive reality	Travel Channel
Paranormal Lockdown	2016–2019	Paranormal	Reality	Destination America
Paranormal Paparazzi	2012	Paranormal	Reality	Travel Channel
Paranormal State	2007–2011	Paranormal	Reality	A&E
Paranormal Witness	2011–2013, 2015–2016	Paranormal	Documentary	Syfy
The Past Hunters	2015	Paranormal		YourTV (UK)
Patrick Macnee's Ghost Stories	1997			
Penn & Teller: Bullshit!	2003–2010	Paranormal	Documentary	Showtime
The Pet Psychic	2002–2003	Psychics		Animal Planet
Phenomenon	2007		Competition	NBC
Proof Positive: Evidence of the Paranormal	2004	Paranormal	Reality	Sci Fi Channel
Psychic Detectives	2004–2008	Psychics		Court tv
Psychic Kids	2008–2010	Psychic		A&E
Real and Chance: The Legend Hunters	2010	Paranormal	Reality	VH1
Rescue Mediums	2006–2011	Psychic	Reality	W Network (Canada)
Ripley's Believe It or Not!	1949–1950	Paranormal		NBC
River Monsters	2009–2017	Skeptical, Cryptozoology	Wildlife documentary	Animal Planet
Scare Tactics	2000–2006	horror/hidden camera		[Syfy]
Scared!	2002–2009	Ghosts		Staten Island Community Television
Scariest Places on Earth	2000–2006	Paranormal	Reality	ABC Family Channel
School Spirits	2012	Ghosts	Documentary	Syfy
Sci Fi Investigates	2006	Paranormal	Reality	Sci Fi Channel
Scream Team	2002	Paranormal	Reality	Living TV (UK)
Secrets & Mysteries	1988–1989	Paranormal		Syndication
Sensing Murder	2006–2008, 2010, 2017–2018	Paranormal	Reality	Biography Channel
Sightings	1992–1997	Paranormal	News	Fox
Spøgelsesjægerne	2013	Ghosts	Reality	Kanal 5 (Denmark)
Stranded	2013	Paranormal	Investigation	Syfy
Strange but True?	1993–1997	Paranormal	Documentary	ITV (UK)
Strange Universe	1996–1998	Paranormal	News Magazine	UPN, syndicated television
The Successor	2007	Psychic	Competition	(Israel)
Survivorman Bigfoot	2015	Cryptozoology		Discovery Channel / Science Channel
That's Incredible!	1980–1984	Paranormal	Reality	ABC
Truth or Scare	2001–2003	Paranormal		Discovery Kids
UFO Files	2004–2007	UFOs–aliens		History
UFO Hunters	2008–2009	UFOs–aliens		History
UFOs Declassified	2015	UFOs–aliens		History (Canada)
The Unexplained	1996–2000	Paranormal		A&E
The Unexplained	2011–2012	Paranormal	Documentary	Biography Channel
Unexplained Canada	2006	Paranormal		Space (Canada)
The Unexplained Files	2013–2014	Paranormal	Documentary	Science
Unexplained Mysteries	2003–2004	Paranormal	Documentary	Syndication
Unsealed Alien Files	2011–2015	UFOs–aliens	Investigation	History
Unsolved History	2002–2005	Conspiracy/Paranormal		Discovery Channel
Unsolved Mysteries	1987–1997; 1997–1999; 2001–2002	Paranormal	Documentary	NBC; CBS
Weird or What?	2010–2012	Paranormal		Discovery Channel; History Television (Canada)
Weird Travels	2001–2006	Paranormal	Documentary	Travel Channel
Weird U.S.	2004–2005	Paranormal	Reality	History
Wrestling With Ghosts	2017–2018	Paranormal	Documentary	ASY TV
The X Creatures	1999	Cryptozoology	Documentary	BBC

== See also ==
- List of ghost films
