= List of programs broadcast by Syfy =

The following is a list of TV programs for the American channel Syfy and many of its international sister networks, including both original and acquired programming.

== Current programming ==
The following programs first aired in their entirety or had specific seasons on American Syfy channel. Programs running on the present schedule are listed below.

=== Drama ===
Title	Genre	Premiere	Seasons	Status
The Ark	Science fiction drama	February 1, 2023	3 seasons, 36 episodes	Pending

== Former programming ==
=== Drama ===
Title	Genre	Original broadcast	Seasons	Notes
Mission Genesis	Space opera	1997	1 season, 13 episodes	
Sliders (seasons 4–5)	Science fiction fantasy drama	1998–2000	2 seasons, 40 episodes	Previously aired on Fox for seasons 1–3.
First Wave	Science fiction	1998–2001	3 seasons, 66 episodes	Co-production with Space.
Farscape	Science fiction	1999–2003	4 seasons, 88 episodes	Co-production with Nine Network.
Poltergeist: The Legacy (season 4)	Supernatural horror drama	1999	1 season, 22 episodes	Previously aired on Showtime for seasons 1–3.
Lexx	Science fiction	2000–02	4 seasons, 61 episodes	Acquired from Citytv.
Black Scorpion	Superhero drama	2001	1 season, 22 episodes	
The Secret Adventures of Jules Verne	Science fiction	2001	1 season, 22 episodes	Acquired from CBC.
The Chronicle	Science fiction	2001–02	1 season, 22 episodes	
Stargate SG-1 (seasons 6–10)	Action-adventure military science fiction drama	2002–07	5 seasons, 104 episodes	Previously aired on Showtime for seasons 1–5.
Stargate Atlantis	Action-adventure military science fiction drama	2004–09	5 seasons, 100 episodes	
Andromeda (season 5)	Science fiction	2004–05	1 season, 22 episodes	Previously aired via syndication for seasons 1–4.
Battlestar Galactica	Military science fiction drama	2004–09	4 seasons, 76 episodes	Co-production with Sky One.
Doctor Who (seasons 1–4)	Science fiction	2006–08	4 seasons, 55 episodes	Acquired from BBC One. Moved to BBC America for seasons 5–13, and then moved to Disney+ for season 14 onward.
The Dresden Files	Dark fantasy mystery drama	2007	1 season, 12 episodes	
Painkiller Jane	Superhero drama	2007	1 season, 22 episodes	Co-production with Global.
Flash Gordon	Action-adventure comedy drama	2007–08	1 season, 22 episodes	
Charlie Jade	Science fiction	2008	1 season, 20 episodes	Acquired from Space.
Sanctuary	Science fiction fantasy drama	2008–11	4 seasons, 59 episodes	Continuation of the web series of the same name. Co-production with Space.
Warehouse 13	Science fiction mystery drama	2009–14	5 seasons, 64 episodes	
Stargate Universe	Action-adventure military science fiction drama	2009–11	2 seasons, 40 episodes	
Caprica	Science fiction	2010	1 season, 19 episodes	
Merlin (seasons 2–5)	Fantasy adventure drama	2010–13	4 seasons, 52 episodes	Also known as The Adventures of Merlin. Acquired from BBC One. Previously aired on NBC for season 1.
Haven	Supernatural drama	2010–15	5 seasons, 78 episodes	Co-production with Showcase.
Being Human	Supernatural comedy drama	2011–14	4 seasons, 52 episodes	Co-production with Space.
Alphas	Superhero drama	2011–12	2 seasons, 24 episodes	Formerly known as Section 8.
Lost Girl	Supernatural drama	2012–16	5 seasons, 77 episodes	Acquired from Showcase.
Defiance	Science fiction Western drama	2013–15	3 seasons, 38 episodes	
Continuum	Science fiction	2013–15	4 seasons, 42 episodes	Acquired from Showcase.
Primeval: New World	Science fiction	2013	1 season, 13 episodes	Acquired from Space.
Sinbad	Action-adventure fantasy drama	2013	1 season, 12 episodes	Acquired from Sky One.
Helix	Science fiction horror drama	2014–15	2 seasons, 26 episodes	
Bitten	Supernatural fantasy drama	2014–16	3 seasons, 33 episodes	Acquired from Space.
Dominion	Apocalyptic fantasy drama	2014–15	2 seasons, 21 episodes	
Z Nation	Horror drama	2014–18	5 seasons, 68 episodes	
12 Monkeys	Science fiction mystery drama	2015–18	4 seasons, 47 episodes	
Olympus	Fantasy	2015	1 season, 13 episodes	Acquired from Super Channel.
Dark Matter	Space opera	2015–17	3 seasons, 39 episodes	Acquired from Space.
Killjoys	Action-adventure science fiction drama	2015–19	5 seasons, 50 episodes	Co-production with Space (seasons 1–4) and CTV Sci-Fi Channel (season 5).
The Expanse (seasons 1–3)	Science fiction	2015–18	3 seasons, 36 episodes	Later revived by Amazon Prime Video for seasons 4–6.
The Magicians	Fantasy	2015–20	5 seasons, 65 episodes	
Wynonna Earp	Supernatural Weird Western drama	2016–21	4 seasons, 49 episodes	Co-production with Space (seasons 1–3) and CTV Sci-Fi Channel (season 4).
Hunters	Science fiction mystery thriller	2016	1 season, 13 episodes	
Van Helsing	Fantasy horror drama	2016–21	5 seasons, 65 episodes	
Aftermath	Science fiction	2016	1 season, 13 episodes	Co-production with Space.
Incorporated	Science fiction	2016–17	1 season, 10 episodes	
Blood Drive	Science fiction action drama	2017	1 season, 13 episodes	Also known as Midnight Grindhouse Presents: Blood Drive.
Ghost Wars	Supernatural action drama	2017–18	1 season, 13 episodes	
Superstition	Supernatural horror	2017–18	1 season, 12 episodes	
Krypton	Superhero drama	2018–19	2 seasons, 20 episodes	
Nightflyers	Science fiction horror drama	2018	1 season, 10 episodes	Co-production with Netflix.
Deadly Class	Action teen drama	2019	1 season, 10 episodes	
Vagrant Queen	Space Western	2020	1 season, 10 episodes	
SurrealEstate	Supernatural drama	2021–25	3 seasons, 30 episodes	Co-production with CTV Sci-Fi Channel
Day of the Dead	Horror drama	2021	1 season, 10 episodes	
Revival	Supernatural drama	2025	1 season, 10 episodes	Co-production with CTV Sci-Fi Channel

=== Comedy ===
Title	Genre	Original broadcast	Seasons	Notes
Mystery Science Theater 3000 (seasons 8–10)	Science fiction comedy	1997–99	3 seasons, 38 episodes	Previously aired on multiple other channels for seasons 1–7. Later revived by Netflix for seasons 11–12, and revived again by Gizmoplex starting with season 13 onward.
Good vs. Evil (season 2)	Supernatural comedy	2000	1 seasons, 11 episodes	Also known as G vs. E. Previously aired on USA Network for season 1.
The Invisible Man	Superhero action comedy	2000–02	2 seasons, 46 episodes	Also known as The I-Man.
Tremors	Science fiction horror comedy	2003	1 season, 13 episodes	
Eureka	Science fiction comedy drama	2006–12	5 seasons, 77 episodes	
Garth Marenghi's Darkplace	Horror parody	2006	1 season, 6 episodes	Acquired from Channel 4.
Outer Space Astronauts	Science fiction comedy	2009	1 season, 5 episodes	
The Almighty Johnsons (seasons 1–2)	Fantasy comedy drama	2014	2 seasons, 23 episodes	Acquired from TV3. Only the first two seasons were broadcast on Syfy.
Con Man (season 1)	Comedy	2017	1 season, 6 episodes	Acquired from Vimeo. Only the first season was broadcast on Syfy.
Happy!	Black comedy action thriller	2017–19	2 seasons, 18 episodes	
The Movie Show	Comedy	2020–21	1 season, 12 episodes	
Resident Alien	Mystery science fiction comedy drama	2021–25	4 seasons, 44 episodes	Co-production with USA Network (season 4)
Chucky	Slasher comedy drama	2021–24	3 seasons, 24 episodes	Co-production with USA Network.
Astrid & Lilly Save the World	Supernatural teen comedy drama	2022	1 season, 10 episodes	Co-production with CTV Sci-Fi Channel
Reginald the Vampire	Supernatural comedy drama	2022–24	2 seasons, 20 episodes	

=== Anthology ===
Title	Genre	Original broadcast	Seasons	Notes
Welcome to Paradox	Science fiction drama	1998	1 season, 13 episodes	
Exposure	Science fiction	2000–02	2 seasons, 42 episodes	
The Outer Limits (1995 series) (season 7)	Science fiction horror	2001–02	1 season, 22 episodes	Previously aired on Showtime for seasons 1–6.
Métal Hurlant Chronicles	Science fiction fantasy drama	2014	2 seasons, 12 episodes	Acquired from France 4.
Channel Zero	Supernatural horror drama	2016–18	4 seasons, 24 episodes	

=== Miniseries ===
Title	Genre	Original broadcast	Seasons	Notes
Frank Herbert's Dune	Science fiction	2000	3 episodes	
Firestarter: Rekindled	Science fiction horror thriller	2002	2 episodes	
Taken	Science fiction drama	2002	10 episodes	
Frank Herbert's Children of Dune	Science fiction	2003	3 episodes	
Battlestar Galactica	Military science fiction drama	2003	3 episodes	
Five Days to Midnight	Science fiction thriller	2004	5 episodes	
Farscape: The Peacekeeper Wars	Military science fiction drama	2004	2 episodes	
Dark Kingdom: The Dragon King	Fantasy	2004	2 episodes	Co-production with Sat.1.
Legend of Earthsea	Fantasy	2004	2 episodes	
The Triangle	Science fiction	2005	3 episodes	Co-production with BBC One.
The Lost Room	Science fiction mystery drama	2006	3 episodes	
Tin Man	Fantasy	2007	3 episodes	
Knights of Bloodsteel	Fantasy	2009	2 episodes	
Alice	Science fiction fantasy drama	2009	2 episodes	Co-production with Showcase.
Riverworld	Science fiction	2010	2 episodes	
The Phantom	Superhero drama	2010	2 episodes	
Neverland	Fantasy	2011	2 episodes	
Treasure Island	Action-adventure drama	2012	2 episodes	Acquired from Sky One.
Ascension	Science fiction mystery drama	2014	6 episodes	Co-production with CBC.
Childhood's End	Science fiction	2015	3 episodes	

=== Adult animation ===
Title	Genre	Original broadcast	Seasons	Notes
Tripping the Rift	Science fiction comedy	2004–07	3 seasons, 39 episodes	
Alien News Desk	Science fiction comedy	2019	1 season, 12 episodes	
Science!	Science fiction comedy	2019	1 season, 6 episodes	
Magical Girl Friendship Squad: Origins	Fantasy comedy	2020	1 season, 6 episodes	
Dr. Havoc's Diary	Superhero comedy	2020	1 season, 30 episodes	Acquired from Fullscreen.
Magical Girl Friendship Squad	Fantasy comedy	2020	1 season, 6 episodes	
Wild Life	Post-apocalyptic comedy	2020	1 season, 6 episodes	
Hell Den (season 2)	Post-apocalyptic sketch comedy	2020	1 season, 6 episodes	Previously aired on DrinkTV for season 1.
Devil May Care	Supernatural comedy	2021	1 season, 7 episodes	
The Pole	Fantasy comedy	2021	1 season, 6 episodes	
The Summoner	Science fiction comedy	2021	1 season, 10 episodes	

=== Unscripted ===
==== Docuseries ====
Title	Genre	Original broadcast	Seasons	Notes
Sightings (season 5)	Paranormal docuseries	1996–98	1 season, 26 episodes	Previously aired on Fox for seasons 1–2 and via syndication for seasons 3–4.
In Search of... (season 7)	Paranormal docuseries	2002	1 season, 8 episodes	Also known as Great Mysteries of the World. Previously aired via syndication for seasons 1–6. Later revived by History for seasons 8–9.
Beast Legends	Docuseries	2010	1 season, 6 episodes	
Legend Quest	Travel docuseries	2011	1 season, 6 episodes	
School Spirits	Paranormal docuseries	2012	1 season, 6 episodes	
Weird or What? (seasons 2–3)	Docuseries	2013–14	2 seasons, 20 episodes	Previously aired on Discovery Channel for season 1.
Town of the Living Dead	Docuseries	2014	1 season, 12 episodes	
Bazillion Dollar Club	Docuseries	2015	1 season, 1 episode (5 episodes unaired)	Six episodes were filmed but the series was pulled after the first episode.
The Internet Ruined My Life	Docuseries	2016	1 season, 6 episodes	
Looking for Leia	Docuseries	2019	1 season, 7 episodes	

==== Game shows ====
Title	Genre	Original Broadcast	Seasons	Notes
Total Blackout	Game show	2012–13	2 seasons, 24 episodes	
Exit	Game show	2013	1 season, 6 episodes	
Geeks Who Drink	Game show/Reality competition	2015	1 season, 12 episodes	

==== Reality ====
Title	Genre	Original broadcast	Seasons	Notes
Crossing Over with John Edward	Reality	2000–04	4 seasons, 99 episodes	
Scare Tactics	Reality	2003–13	5 seasons, 114 episodes	Later revived by USA Network for season 5
Mad Mad House	Reality competition	2004	1 season, 8 episodes	
Ghost Hunters (seasons 1–11)	Paranormal reality	2004–16	11 seasons, 230 episodes	Later revived by A&E for seasons 12–13. Moved again to Discovery+ for season 14. Moved again to the Travel Channel for season 15 onward.
Proof Positive	Paranormal reality	2004	1 season, 10 episodes	
Psychic at Large	Reality	2006	1 season, 6 episodes	
Who Wants to Be a Superhero?	Reality competition	2006–07	2 seasons, 14 episodes	
Sci Fi Investigates	Reality	2006	1 season, 6 episodes	
Destination Truth	Paranormal reality/Travel	2007–12	5 seasons, 55 episodes	Also known as The Monster Hunter.
Mind Control with Derren Brown	Reality	2007	1 season, 6 episodes	
Guinea Pig (season 1)	Reality	2008	1 season, 6 episodes	Acquired from Discovery Channel. Only the first season was broadcast on Syfy.
Ghost Hunters International	Paranormal reality/Travel	2008–12	3 seasons, 62 episodes	
Cha$e	Reality competition	2008	1 season, 6 episodes	
Estate of Panic	Reality competition	2008	1 season, 6 episodes	
WCG Ultimate Gamer	Reality competition	2009–10	2 seasons, 16 episodes	
Ghost Hunters Academy	Paranormal reality	2009–10	1 season, 12 episodes	
Fact or Faked: Paranormal Files	Paranormal reality	2010–12	2 seasons, 36 episodes	
Mary Knows Best	Docusoap/Reality	2010	1 season, 4 episodes (2 episodes unaired)	Six episodes were filmed but the series was pulled after four episodes.
Hollywood Treasure	Reality	2010–12	2 seasons, 30 episodes	
Face Off	Reality competition	2011–18	13 seasons, 160 episodes	
Marcel's Quantum Kitchen	Cooking show/Reality	2011	1 season, 6 episodes	
Haunted Collector	Paranormal reality	2011–13	3 seasons, 30 episodes	
Paranormal Witness	Paranormal reality	2011–16	5 seasons, 64 episodes	
Monster Man	Reality	2012	1 season, 6 episodes	
Dream Machines	Reality	2012	1 season, 6 episodes	
Insane or Inspired?	Reality	2012	1 season, 6 episodes	
Haunted Highway	Paranormal reality	2012–13	2 seasons, 12 episodes	
Collection Intervention	Reality	2012	1 season, 6 episodes	
Hot Set	Reality competition	2012	1 season, 6 episodes	
Deals from the Darkside	Reality	2012	1 season, 13 episodes	
Viral Video Showdown	Reality competition	2012	1 season, 8 episodes	
Ghost Mine	Paranormal reality	2013	2 seasons, 18 episodes	
Robot Combat League	Reality competition	2013	1 season, 9 episodes	
Stranded	Paranormal reality	2013	1 season, 6 episodes	
Deep South Paranormal	Paranormal reality	2013	1 season, 6 episodes	
Joe Rogan Questions Everything	Reality	2013	1 season, 6 episodes	
Heroes of Cosplay	Reality competition	2013–14	2 seasons, 12 episodes	
Naked Vegas	Reality	2013	1 season, 6 episodes	
Fangasm	Reality competition	2013	1 season, 6 episodes	
Killer Contact	Paranormal reality/Travel	2013	1 season, 6 episodes	
Opposite Worlds	Reality competition	2014	1 season, 12 episodes	
Haunting: Australia	Paranormal reality	2014	1 season, 8 episodes	
Jim Henson's Creature Shop Challenge	Reality competition	2014	1 season, 8 episodes	
Wizard Wars	Reality competition	2014–15	1 season, 12 episodes	
Troy: Street Magic	Reality	2015	2 seasons, 10 episodes	Acquired from E4.
Close Up Kings	Reality	2015	1 season, 8 episodes	
Cosplay Melee	Reality competition	2017	1 season, 6 episodes	
Face Off: Game Face	Reality competition	2017	1 season, 7 episodes	

==== Variety ====
Title	Genre	Original broadcast	Seasons	Notes
FTL Newsfeed	Science fiction interstitial	1992–96	4 seasons, 1106 episodes	
SF Vortex		1996-98		
The Dream Team with Annabelle and Michael	Talk show	2003	1 season, 22 episodes (43 episodes unaired)	65 episodes were filmed but the series was pulled after 22 episodes.
Into the Unknown with George Noory	Talk show	2008	1 season, 5 episodes	
The Wil Wheaton Project	Talk show	2014	1 season, 12 episodes	
Reactor	Talk show	2015	1 season, 5 episodes	Twelve episodes were originally ordered but the series was pulled after five episodes.
Syfy Wire's The Great Debate	Talk show	2020	1 season, 8 episodes	Twelve episodes were originally ordered but the series was pulled after eight episodes.

=== Pro wrestling ===
Title	Genre	Original broadcast	Seasons	Notes
WWE ECW	Professional wrestling	2006–10	5 seasons, 193 episodes	Also known as ECW on Sci-Fi.
WWE NXT (seasons 1–3)	Professional wrestling	2010; 2021–24	3 seasons, 32 episodes (plus six specials)	Also known as NXT 2.0. Moved online to multiple websites and streaming services partway through season 3. Moved again to USA Network partway through season 13. Moved again to The CW partway through season 18 onwards. Six specials aired on Syfy in 2021, 2022, and 2024 as part of seasons 15, 16, and 18 respectively.
WWE SmackDown (seasons 12–17)	Professional wrestling	2010–15	5 seasons, 275 episodes	Also known as Friday Night SmackDown. Previously aired on multiple other networks/channels for seasons 1–11. Moved to USA Network partway through season 18. Moved again to Fox partway through season 21. Moved back to USA Network partway through season 26 onwards.

== Syfy second-run programming ==
=== Current programming ===
- Bates Motel (2023–present)
- Gary and His Demons (2019–present) (Note: Also aired in TZGZ)
- Quantum Leap (1989 TV series) (1994–2006; 2022–present)
- The Twilight Zone (1995–present)
- Quantum Leap (2022 TV series) (2022–present)
- NCIS: Los Angeles (2023–present)

=== Former programming ===
Many of the following series used to be aired frequently on S.C.I.F.I. World, a daytime programming schedule started on in July 2000, that divided its marathons into five days that concentrated on five particular themes:
Superheroland, Creatureland, Intergalacticland, Fantasticland and Inhumanland.

- The 4400 (2005–06)
- Alfred Hitchcock Presents (1992–96)
- Alien Nation (1992–2002)
- All Souls (2008–09)
- The Amazing Spider-Man (1993; 1995–98)
- Amazing Stories (1992–2006)
- American Gothic (1998–2001)
- The Anti-Gravity Room (1995–98)
- Babylon 5 (2000–03)
- Back to the Future (1994–96)
- Batman (1997; 2000–01)
- Battlestar Galactica (1992–2001)
- Beakman's World
- Beastmaster (2004–07)
- Beauty and the Beast (1994–96)
- Beyond Belief: Fact or Fiction (2002–05)
- Beyond Reality (1994–95; 1997–2000)
- Bionic Six (1995–97)
- The Bionic Woman (1994–2000; 2007)
- Brimstone (1999–2002; 2009)
- Buck Rogers in the 25th Century
- Cable in the Classroom
- Captain Simian & the Space Monkeys (1999–2000)
- Captain Scarlet and the Mysterons (1995–97)
- Cleopatra 2525 (2003–04)
- Code Name: Eternity (2004–06)
- The Crow: Stairway to Heaven (2000–03)
- Crusade (2001–03)
- Dark Angel (2006–09)
- Dark Shadows
- Dark Shadows (1991 series)
- Dark Skies
- Darkroom
- Dead Like Me
- Defenders of the Earth
- Doctor Who (1992–93)
- Early Edition
- Earth 2
- Earth: Final Conflict
- The End Is Nye
- Extreme Ghostbusters
- The Fantastic Journey (1992–96)
- Fantastic Voyage
- Fantasy Island
- Firefly
- Friday the 13th: The Series
- Forever Knight (1996–99; 2002–03)
- Futurama (2017–21)
- Future Cop
- Galactica 1980
- Galaxy High School (1993–94; 1996)
- Gemini Man (1992–96; 1998; 2000)
- Ghost Whisperer
- Golden Years
- Grave Times
- The Green Hornet
- Hammer House of Horror
- Hammer House of Mystery and Suspense
- Haunted
- Hercules: The Legendary Journeys
- Here Comes the Grump (1993–94)
- Heroes Reborn
- H.G. Wells' The Invisible Man
- Harley Quinn
- Highlander
- Highlander: The Raven
- The Hitchhiker
- The Hitchhiker's Guide to the Galaxy
- The Immortal
- In Search of...
- The Incredible Hulk
- Intergalactic
- Inside Space
- The Invaders
- The Invisible Man
- Jake 2.0
- Joe 90
- John Doe
- Journey to the Center of the Earth
- Jumanji
- Kindred: The Embraced
- King Arthur and the Knights of Justice
- Knight Rider
- Kolchak: The Night Stalker
- Kraft Suspense Theatre
- Land of the Giants
- Land of the Lost
- The Last Kingdom
- Lazer Patrol
- Level 9
- Little Shop
- Lost in Space
- The Magician
- Manifest
- Manimal
- Mann & Machine
- Master Blasters (2005)
- Max Headroom
- Misfits of Science
- Monsters
- Moonlight
- My Secret Identity (1993–97)
- Mysteries from Beyond the Other Dominion
- The New Adventures of Flash Gordon
- The New Adventures of Gigantor
- Night Gallery (syndicated series, including episodes of The Sixth Sense)
- Night Stalker
- Night Visions
- Nightmare Cafe
- Now and Again
- Odyssey 5
- One Step Beyond
- Otherworld
- The Outer Limits (1999–2010)
- Passions
- The Phoenix
- Planet of the Apes
- The Powers of Matthew Star
- Prey
- Primeval
- The Prisoner
- Probe
- The Ray Bradbury Theater (1994–98; 2000–02)
- Raze
- Return to the Planet of the Apes (1992–94)
- Ripley's Believe It or Not! (1982) (1994–97)
- Ripley's Believe It or Not! (2000) (2005–10)
- Roar (2003–06)
- RoboCop: The Series
- Robotech (1993–94)
- Roswell
- Roswell Conspiracies: Aliens, Myths and Legends
- The Science Show
- SciFi Buzz
- SciFi Declassified
- SciFi Trader
- SeaQuest DSV (1997–2001; 2005)
- The Sentinel
- Seven Days
- She-Wolf of London
- The Six Million Dollar Man
- Skysurfer Strike Force
- Something Is Out There
- Sonic Underground
- Space: 1999 (1992–96)
- Space: Above and Beyond (1998–2001)
- Special Unit 2
- Stargate Infinity
- Starman
- Star Trek
- Star Trek: The Animated Series
- Star Trek: Enterprise
- Star Trek: The Next Generation
- Star Wars: Droids (1993–97)
- Star Wars: Ewoks (1993–97)
- Stingray
- Strange World
- Swamp Thing
- Swamp Thing: The Animated Series
- Tales from the Crypt
- Tales from the Darkside
- TekWar
- Terrahawks
- Timecop
- Threshold
- The Time Tunnel
- Tracker
- The Transformers (1992–97)
- Thriller
- Tru Calling
- The Twilight Zone
- UFO
- V
- Viper
- The Visitor
- Voyage to the Bottom of the Sea
- Voyagers!
- War of the Worlds
- Weird Science
- Wolf Lake
- Wonder Woman (1998–2001)
- Xena: Warrior Princess (2000)
- The X-Files
- Zoey's Extraordinary Playlist

=== TZGZ second-run animated programming ===
- The Alien Guide to Earth
- Brogan: Master of Castles
- The Cyanide & Happiness Show
- Dallas & Robo
- Don't Feed the Humans
- Purgatony

=== Other second-run programming ===
- Chuck
- CSI: Crime Scene Investigation
- Departure
- Heroes
- Law & Order: Special Victims Unit (Four episodes aired on one night. All were related to serial killers.)
- Lost
- NCIS: Los Angeles
- Passions
- Spartacus
- Surface

=== Movie marathons ===
- Made in Columbia Pictures (Labor Day)
- Godzilla's Thanksgiving Showdown (Thanksgiving and Black Friday)
- Twas the Fight...: A Marathon of Kaiju Movies (Christmas Eve and Christmas)
- Have a Sci-fi New Years! (New Year's Eve and New Year's Day)

== Anime shown on Syfy ==
The Saturday Anime logo as it appeared on the Sci Fi Channel website, circa the late 1990s.

For most of the 1990s, Syfy showed anime films, although they had to be edited in order to be shown on basic cable. The channel's longest running animation block, referred to as Saturday Anime, aired at the start of the channel's broadcast day each Saturday morning. In 2007, Syfy reintroduced anime to their programming via the "Ani-Monday" block. In 2008 the block was shifted to Tuesday; in 2010, to Thursday; and after June 9, 2011, disappeared abruptly, along with the Anime section of the Syfy.com website. Licensors that have supported this block included Streamline Pictures, Central Park Media, Manga Entertainment USA, and Geneon Entertainment USA among others. The licensor that has aired it on the block is shown after the title.

- 8 Man After (Streamline Pictures)
- Adieu Galaxy Express 999 (Viz Media)
- Akira (Streamline Pictures dub) (Streamline Pictures)
- Appleseed (Geneon Entertainment USA)
- Appleseed (OVA) (Manga Entertainment USA)
- Armitage III: Poly-Matrix (Geneon Entertainment USA)
- Black Jack: The Movie (Manga Entertainment USA)
- Black Magic M-66 (Manga Entertainment USA)
- Casshan: Robot Hunter (Streamline Pictures)
- Chrono Crusade (ADV Films)
- Dead Leaves (Manga Entertainment USA)
- Demon City Shinjuku (Central Park Media)
- Descendants of Darkness (Central Park Media)
- Dominion: Tank Police (edited) (Central Park Media)
- E.Y.E.S. of Mars (Streamline Pictures)
- Fatal Fury: The Motion Picture (Viz Media)
- Final Fantasy: The Spirits Within (Sony Pictures)
- Galaxy Express 999 (Viz Media)
- Gall Force: Eternal Story (Central Park Media)
- Ghost in the Shell (Manga Entertainment USA)
- Ghost in the Shell: Stand Alone Complex - Solid State Society (Manga Entertainment USA)
- Green Legend Ran (Geneon Entertainment USA)
- Gurren Lagann (Bandai Entertainment)
- Highlander: The Search for Vengeance (Manga Entertainment USA)
- Iria: Zeiram the Animation (Central Park Media)
- Kai Doh Maru (Manga Entertainment USA)
- Karas: The Prophecy (Manga Entertainment USA)
- Karas: The Revelation (Manga Entertainment USA)
- Lensman (Streamline Pictures)
- Lily C.A.T. (Streamline Pictures)
- Macross Plus (Manga Entertainment USA)
- MD Geist (Central Park Media)
- MD Geist II: Death Force (Central Park Media)
- Mobile Suit Gundam 00 (Bandai Entertainment)
- Monster (Viz Media)
- Monster Rancher (BKN)
- Negadon: The Monster from Mars (Central Park Media)
- The New Adventures of Gigantor (Streamline Pictures)
- Ninja Scroll (Manga Entertainment USA)
- Noein: To Your Other Self (Manga Entertainment USA)
- Now and Then, Here and There (Central Park Media)
- Odin: Starlight Mutiny (Central Park Media)
- Perfect Blue (Manga Entertainment USA)
- Project A-ko (Central Park Media)
- Project A-ko: Grey Side/Blue Side (Central Park Media)
- Psychic Wars (Manga Entertainment USA)
- Rave Master (Tokyopop)
- Read or Die (OVA) (Manga Entertainment USA)
- Record of Lodoss War (1990 OVA series, first three episodes only) (Central Park Media)
- Robot Carnival (Streamline Pictures)
- Roujin Z (Central Park Media)
- Star Blazers: The Quest for Iscandar (Voyager Entertainment)
- Strait Jacket (Manga Entertainment USA)
- Street Fighter Alpha: The Animation (Manga Entertainment USA)
- Street Fighter Alpha: Generations (Manga Entertainment USA)
- Street Fighter II: The Animated Movie (Manga Entertainment USA)
- Street Fighter II V (Manga Entertainment USA)
- Sword for Truth (Manga Entertainment USA)
- Tactics (Manga Entertainment USA)
- Tenchi the Movie: Tenchi Muyo in Love (Geneon Entertainment USA)
- Tokko (Manga Entertainment USA)
- Urusei Yatsura 2: Beautiful Dreamer (Central Park Media)
- Vampire Hunter D (1985 film) (Urban Vision)
- Vampire Wars (Manga Entertainment USA)
- Venus Wars (Central Park Media)
- Virus Buster Serge (Manga Entertainment USA)
- The Wicked and the Damned: A Hundred Tales of Karma (Geneon Entertainment USA)
- X (Manga Entertainment USA)

== Other programming ==
- 13: Fear Is Real
- 666 Park Avenue
- AHHH Zombies
- The American Scream
- Apparitions
- Automan (1994–96; 2000–01)
- Black Blood Brothers
- Buffy the Vampire Slayer
- Can You Survive a Horror Movie?
- Charmed
- Children of Darkness
- Chiller 13: The Decade's Scariest Movie Moments
- Chiller 13: Horror's Creepiest Kids
- Dark Realm
- Dead Like Me
- Descendants of Darkness
- Devil May Cry: The Animated Series
- Fear Factor
- The Future of Fear
- The Gates
- Ghost Whisperer
- Ghoul
- Harper's Island
- Haunted
- Hex
- The Hunger
- Is This a Zombie?
- Invasion
- Kindred: The Embraced
- Kolchak: The Night Stalker
- Masters of Horror
- Millennium
- Moonbase 3 (1995–96; 1998)
- Monster
- Mork & Mindy (November 28, 2008)
- Most Daring
- The Nightmare Room
- The Others
- Persons Unknown
- Profit
- Pushing Daisies
- Quantum Leap
- Real Fear
- Real Fear: The Truth Behind the Movies
- Scary... But True!
- Sea of Souls
- The Secret Circle
- The Sixth Sense
- Slasher
- Spine Chillers
- Steve Niles' Remains
- Strange
- Strange World
- Tales from the Crypt
- Tales from the Darkside
- Terminator: The Sarah Connor Chronicles
- Todd and the Book of Pure Evil
- Tokko
- Tokyo Majin
- Tru Calling
- The Twilight Zone (1992–93)
- Twin Peaks
- Unexplained Mysteries
- War of the Worlds
- Werewolf
- Wolf Lake
- World's Most Amazing Videos
- The X-Files

== Announced, unrealized projects ==
2002

- The Chronicles of Amber: Four-hour miniseries based on Roger Zelazny's series, scripted by Richard Christian Matheson, with Tom Patricia of Patriarch Pictures as executive producer.
- Colosseum: made-for-TV-movie in which modern-day fight promoter Tommy Pettigrew finds himself transported in time to the Colosseum of Rome in the year AD 95, with a script by Sam Egan. Directed by Mario Philip Azzopardi and executive produced by Egan, Azzopardi, and Matt Loze.
- The Forever War: Four-hour miniseries, scripted by John Fasano and based on Joe Haldeman's novel of that name. Executive producers were Richard Edlund, along with Peter Sussman and Ed Gernon for Alliance Atlantis.
- Myst: Four-hour miniseries based on the video game Myst. A Mandalay Television Pictures production, executive produced by Elizabeth Stephen with Rand Miller and Susan Bonds of Cyan, in association with Columbia Tri Star Domestic Television and distributed through USA Cable Entertainment.
- On the Seventh Day: Seven-hour miniseries set in 2850 in an overcrowded world in which the government has assigned people one day a week to live, while spending the remaining six days in Cryopreservation, from writer and executive producer Gary Sherman and USA Cable Entertainment.
- Quantum Leap: Syfy announced development of a two-hour television film based on Quantum Leap that would have served as a backdoor pilot for a possible new series, with series creator Donald P. Bellisario returning as executive producer.

2003

- 1000 Days: A live-action made-for-TV-movie and backdoor pilot based on the Marvel Comics series Strikeforce: Morituri, about near-future soldiers who gain enhanced abilities but die 1,000 days later. Written by Art Marcum and Matt Holloway, it was a Reveille Productions and Marvel Studios co-production executive produced by Reveille head Ben Silverman and Marvel Studios' Avi Arad and Rick Ungar.
- Alien Blood: TV-movie of a human rebellion when an invading alien army demands that one million people be sacrificed. Produced by UFO Films.
- Brother Voodoo: A live-action made-for-TV-movie and backdoor pilot based on the Marvel Comics supernatural character Brother Voodoo. Hans Rodionoff was announced to write the screenplay, set in New Orleans, of this Reveille Productions and Marvel Studios co-production executive produced by Reveille head Ben Silverman and Marvel Studios' Avi Arad and Rick Ungar.
- Dead Rail: A made-for-TV-movie set aboard a bullet train headed to Las Vegas on its inaugural run, and a detective who must battle hostile aliens. Written by Brian Smith, "founder of SciFi.com's Seeing Ear Theatre", and produced by Glow Worm.
- The Twelve: A miniseries, based on a concept by David Pirie, about an FBI agent who finds evidence that the world will end on the twelfth day of Christmas. With Martin Scorsese and producer Barbara De Fina as executive producers, with Cappa/De Fina Productions in conjunction with Adrian Bate and Zenith Entertainment Ltd., it was scheduled to debut in December 2005.

2004

- Kyra: David Twohy, co-screenwriter and director of Pitch Black and writer-director of its sequels The Chronicles of Riddick and Riddick, said in June 2004 he was writing the story basis for a Sci-Fi Channel made-for-TV-movie pilot based on the Riddick character Kyra.

2005

- Barbarian Chronicles: A half-hour animated ensemble comedy show created by Brendon Small. To be co-produced by David Letterman's Worldwide Pants production company.
- Dallas in Wonderland: A half-hour reality series hosted by Dallas Campbell, where he attempts to succeed at a series of sci Fi challenges.
- Heroes Anonymous: A live-action show based on the Bongo Comics comic about a group of superheroes that start a support group.
- Seriously Baffling Mysteries: A half-hour mockumentary hosted by Jonathan Frankle, which goes in search of the paranormal on a shoestring budget.
- Return of the Thing: A planned four-hour mini-series that would've served as a sequel to John Carpenter's 1982 horror classic The Thing. Frank Darabont was on board as an executive producer on the series, which would have taken place in both Antarctica and a small town in New Mexico. Though the project fell through, concept art and a screenplay was released.
- Those Who Walk In Darkness: A live-action adaptation of the novel of the same name by John Ridley.
- Time Tunnel: A remake of the 1960s ABC sci-fi series The Time Tunnel. Co-produced with Fox Television Studios and Kevin Burns and Jon Jashni of Synthesis Entertainment. Written by John Turman.
- Tomorrow's Child: A series about a girl who received extraordinary powers after being saved by an alien. Produced by NBC Universal Television Studio and Gary Foster's Horseshoe Bay Productions.
- Urban Arcana: A live-action series based on the role-playing game. Aron Coleite was to write and Gary A. Randall and Rockne S. O'Bannon were to produce in association with Fox Television Studios.

2012

- Blake's 7: On July 23, 2012, Deadline Hollywood reported that a remake for US television networks was being developed by the independent studio Georgeville Television. Syfy announced on August 22, 2012 that Joe Pokaski would develop the script and Martin Campbell would direct the new remake. In 2013 it was reported that Syfy had ordered a full-series order of thirteen episodes but nothing following this report materialized. Other media reported that a full-series order of thirteen episodes had been placed.

2018

- Tremors: On November 28, 2015, it was reported that Universal Television and Blumhouse Productions were developing a new Tremors TV series and that Kevin Bacon would reprise his role of Valentine McKee for the first time in the series since the first movie. In August 2017, it was announced that Vincenzo Natali would direct the pilot which would be written by showrunner Andrew Miller with filming taking place from late October 2017 through November 2017. On April 28, 2018, it was announced that Syfy had passed on the pilot.

2019

- Cipher: In January 2019, it was announced that Syfy had given the AI drama project a pilot order with Universal Content Productions. The pilot was directed by Peter Hoar and written by Allison Miller who also served as executive producer. It was later reported that Syfy had passed on the project.
- (Future) Cult Classic: In January 2019, it was announced that Syfy had given the dark comedy project a pilot order with Universal Content Productions. The pilot was directed by Tim Kirkby and written by Shay Hatten, both of whom served as executive producers. It was later reported that Syfy had passed on the project.

== See also ==
- List of programmes broadcast by Syfy (British and Irish TV channel)
- List of science fiction comedy films
- List of science fiction television programs
- Chiller

== Sources ==
- Syfy's Original Movies
- Syfy's Schedule
- The Inner Mind's Sci-Fi Channel schedule lists — dates as far back as 1994 and then some
