= Behind the Scenes =

Behind the Scenes may refer to:

== Books ==
- Behind the Scenes: Or, Thirty Years a Slave and Four Years in the White House, an 1868 autobiography by Elizabeth Keckley

== Film and TV ==
- behind the scenes, making-of, in cinema, a behind-the-scenes documentary film about the production of the film or TV series
- Behind the Scenes, a 1904 film directed by Alf Collins
- Behind the Scenes (1908 film), a 1908 film directed by D.W. Griffith
- Behind the Scenes (1914 film), a silent film starring Mary Pickford
- Behind the Scenes (2025 film), a 2025 Nigerian drama film
- Behind the Scenes (American TV series), a 1992 American children's documentary miniseries
- Behind the Scenes (Canadian TV series), a Canadian documentary series since 1997
- Behind the Scenes, a documentary released by record artist Zendaya

== Music ==
- Behind the Scenes (band), a German gothic rock band
- Behind the Scene, a 1983 album by Reba McEntire

== See also ==
- Backstage (disambiguation)
- Behind the Screen, a 1916 short subject written and directed by Charlie Chaplin
