= Shadow Hunter =

Shadow Hunter may refer to:

- Shadow Hunter (TV series), a Canadian television show
- Shadow Hunter (comic), a comic book series from Virgin Comics
- Darth Maul: Shadow Hunter, a 2001 novel set in the Star Wars galaxy
- Shadow Hunter, a 1990 album by Davy Spillane
- 160 Squadron Shadow Hunter of the Israeli Air Force

== See also ==
- Shadowhunters, an American television series based on The Mortal Instruments
- Shadow Hunters, a Japanese board game
