= Mysterious Journeys =

- Narrated by: Erik Todd Dellums
- Country of origin: United States
- No. of episodes: 14

Production
- Producer: Authentic Entertainment
- Running time: 45 minutes

Original release
- Network: Travel Channel
- Release: March 2002 – November 2007

Mysterious Journeys is a paranormal television series that aired on the Travel Channel. Similar to Weird Travels (on the same channel), In Search Of..., and Is It Real? (on the National Geographic Channel), the show explores a variety of topics often considered pseudoscientific or paranormal, covering everything from ghosts, monsters, and UFOs to strange disappearances and historical locations. The show is usually presented through interviews, reenactments and scene footage, with narration by Dellums.

The show premiered on March 20, 2002, and ran a limited 4-episode season, halting production until 2007 when an additional 10 episodes aired. The show has since halted production and it is unknown if any further episodes will air, as there is little to no information available on the Travel Channel's website.

== Cast and crew ==
- Erik Todd Dellums - Narrator
- Ron Zimmerman - Director (2002)
- Joe Swift - Executive Producer (2002)
- Mike Mathis - Producer (2002)
- Vera Golakova - Supervising Producer (2002)
- Joshua Finn - Segment Producer (2002)
- Kurt Knutsen - Post Supervisor (2002)
- Megan Peterson - Writer/Director/Producer (2007)
- Elizabeth Browde - Executive Producer (2007)
- Valerie W. Chow - Executive Producer/Supervising Producer (2007)
- Tom Rogan - Executive Producer (2007)
- Lawrence Williams - Producer (2007)
- Cassie Lambert - Segment Producer (2007)

== Episodes ==
=== Season 1 (2002) ===
No.	Title	Original release date
1	"Mysterious Journeys"	March 20, 2002
The debut episode examines locations reputed to host paranormal phenomena such as ghosts and UFOs.
2	"The Unknownship"	March 25, 2002
A South Carolina farmhouse where residents have seen and photographed ghosts, crop circles in England and a woman who mysteriously disappears are examined.
3	"The Supernatural"	March 26, 2002
A Los Angeles comedy club where comedians encounter supernatural beings, a haunted English castle and unexplained lights on a North Carolina mountain are examined.
4	"The Unexplained"	March 27, 2002
A monster that haunts Okanagan Lake in British Columbia, a haunted hotel on the California coast and a young woman's mysterious disappearance while traveling to San Francisco are examined.

=== Season 2 (2007) ===
No.	Title	Original release date
5	"Area 51"	August 31, 2007
Sites where extraterrestrials are said to have appeared, including Easter Island and Area 51 are examined.
6	"The Ghosts of Gettysburg"	October 5, 2007
Strange sounds and visions in Gettysburg, PA, alleged to be one of the most haunted locations in United States, are examined.
7	"Alien Hot Spots"	October 12, 2007
Locations purported to have ShortSummary = Alien activity, including Stonehenge, Area 51, Easter Island and Roswell, N.M are examined.
8	"The Ghosts of Medieval Britain"	October 23, 2007
Various reputedly haunted sites and locales from throughout medieval England are examined.
9	"The Hunt for Dracula"	October 24, 2007
Sites and locations around Romania are examined for information on Dracula, the real man behind the legend.
10	"Prison of Horrors: Eastern State Penitentiary"	October 26, 2007
The reported ghosts and haunting of Eastern State Penitentiary in Philadelphia, a Quaker prison built in 1829, are examined.
11	"The Witches of Salem"	October 28, 2007
The 1692 Salem witch trials and their legacy on the seaside village of ShortSummary = Salem, MA are examined.
12	"Easter Island"	November 2, 2007
Easter Island and its more than 800 enormous, enigmatic stone statues are examined.
13	"Haunted Scotland"	November 9, 2007
Various reputedly haunted sites and locales across Scotland are examined.
14	"Nazca Lines"	November 16, 2007
The mysterious Nazca Lines, geoglyphs etched into the Peruvian desert, are examined.

== Reception ==
The ratings of Mysterious Journeys have been positive, gaining a 4.5 out of 5 on TVGuide.com.
