= Backstage =

Backstage may refer to:

- Backstage (theatre), the areas of a theatre that are not part of the house or stage

== Film and television ==
- Back Stage (1917 film), a silent film starring Oliver Hardy
- Back Stage (1919 film), a silent film starring Buster Keaton
- Back Stage (1923 film), a silent Our Gang short
- Backstage (1927 film), a silent comedy feature starring William Collier Jr. and Barbara Bedford
- Limelight (1936 film), a British musical also known as Backstage
- Backstage (1939 film), an Italian comedy film
- Backstage (1988 film), an Australian film
- Backstage (2000 film), a rap concert documentary
- Backstage (2005 film), a French film directed by Emmanuelle Bercot
- Backstage (2021 film), an Indonesian film
- Backstage (South African TV series), a 2000–2007 South African youth-targeted soap opera television series
- Backstage (Canadian TV series), a 2016–2017 Canadian television drama series about a performing arts high school that aired on Family Channel

== Other ==
- Backstage (album), by Cher
- Backstage (publication), an entertainment-industry brand that publishes Backstage magazine, Call Sheet, and Backstage.com
- Backstage.bbc.co.uk, a developer network of the BBC
- Backstage View, a feature of Microsoft Office, starting with Microsoft Office 2010

== See also ==
- Behind the Scenes (disambiguation)
- Clown alley, a backstage area of a circus
