= Rescue Mediums =

Canadian television series

- Genre: Paranormal; Reality
- Starring: Jackie Dennison (2006-2011); Alison Wynne-Ryder (2009-2011); Christine Hamlett (2006-2007)
- Country of origin: Canada
- No. of seasons: 7
- No. of episodes: 89

Production
- Executive producers: Gregory Sheppard; Michael Lamport
- Running time: 22 minutes (Primetime)

Original release
- Network: W Network, OWN, VIVA
- Release: March 10, 2006 – July 2, 2011

Rescue Mediums is a Canadian paranormal reality television series that originally aired from March 10, 2006 to July 17, 2011 on the W Network. The show stars Jackie Dennison and Christine Hamlett in series 1–3 and Jackie and Alison Wynne-Ryder series 4-7. The show has also aired on the WE: Women's Entertainment network in the USA, Discovery Channel in the UK (series 1–3) and CBS reality (series 3–5) UK.

The series follows the trials and tribulations of acclaimed and quirky international psychics, who make house calls, as they ask ghostly spirits to leave.

Composer Richard Evans was nominated for a 2010 Gemini Award for the sound track of the Rescue Mediums episode "Rockside - The Shape of Things to Come".

This scripted show quickly became popular due to the intense storylines and acting, making the show very popular in the United States and Canada

== Host Information ==
=== Jackie Dennison ===
Jackie, in addition to being the co-host of Rescue Mediums (which airs in over 28 countries around the globe) is the owner of The Feathers Academy in Barnton, Cheshire.

Feathers is dedicated to teaching students how to gain knowledge on their own clients before meeting, and how to bring this to light during client interaction to provide the “psychic” experience.

She has been a “psychic”medium and psychic artist for many years and works with her “spirit guides”, Jeremkyah and Red Cloud.

She has co-authored a book about the spirits in Marbury Hall in the UK, and has featured in numerous magazines and newspapers, and continues to work as a medium in her native England. Jackie is in all episodes of the show, from seasons 1 - 7.

=== Alison Wynne-Ryder ===
Alison is a psychic medium and a Reiki Master. She works through her spirit guide, Ruby, who has an extremely quirky sense of humour that comes through time after time. Alison has also worked extensively with the Northwich Police Services. Alison is in 52 episodes, from season 4 - 7.

=== Christine Hamlett ===
Christine is a natural medium and psychic artist, and is the co-host of Rescue Mediums seasons 1, 2, and 3. In addition to this international reputation, she writes for various spiritualists and popular UK women's magazines with a regular psychic sketch in Chat. She has also been featured in numerous UK and Canadian magazines and featured on radio shows in the UK, United States, and Canada. Christine has appeared on ITV and the BBC in England. Christine has been a medium and psychic artist from a very early age, and inherited a crystal ball from her psychic great grandmother when she was only five years old. Outside of the show, Christine helps on missing persons and cold cases, such as those of as Lois Hanna and Rhonda Wilson. Christine is in 37 episodes, from seasons 1 to 3, with the last of her Rescue Mediums work being filmed in 2007.

=== Gregory Sheppard & Michael Lamport ===
Gregory Sheppard and Michael Lamport are co-owners of Lamport-Sheppard Entertainment, which produces Rescue Mediums. They are also the executive producers of Curious and Unusual Deaths (Discovery), Suite & Simple (CTV Travel, Fine Living), In Your Wildest Dreams (Discovery USA), and have produced and directed a new feature comedy, St. Roz, that has garnered several awards at various film festivals.

== Episodic Information ==
Season 1: Episode 01 - 13

Season 2: Episode 14 - 25

Season 3: Episode 26 - 37

Season 4: Episode 38 - 50

Season 5: Episode 50 - 63

Season 6: Episode 63 - 76

Season 7: Episode 76 - 89
