= Wrestling With Ghosts =

American television series

- Genre: Paranormal; Drama; Comedy; Suspense
- Created by: Big Luke Walker
- Written by: Big Luke Walker
- Directed by: Vinnie Vineyard
- Starring: Big Luke Walker; Funkmaster V; Travis Graves; Kandi Thompson
- No. of seasons: 3
- No. of episodes: 21

Production
- Executive producer: Big Luke Walker
- Producer: Vinnie Vineyard
- Cinematography: Big Luke Walker; Travis Graves; Mitchell Gore; Brandon Reese; Jeremy Cantelli
- Editor: Vinnie Vineyard
- Camera setup: Multiple
- Production company: Big N Funky Productions

Original release
- Release: June 30, 2017 – present

Wrestling With Ghosts is an American television series about the paranormal that premiered as a web-series on June 30, 2017. Since then, the show's concept won the Destination America nationwide search for a new creative paranormal team. The show has since been picked up and is now being aired on the ASY TV According to the original introduction, season one follows a paranormal investigator, directly after he loses his original ghost hunting team to what he calls "a demonic attack" and subsequent fist-fight. He then hires three professional wrestlers as protection on future investigations. In 2021, the series started airing on the Intrigue Channel. In 2025, TheSmokies.com rated Wrestling With Ghosts as the sixth best TV show to be filmed in the Great Smoky Mountains.

In 2019, Luke Walker and Vinnie Vineyard co-wrote a script for the movie The Hike based on their Episode 3.1 experiences trying to find Spearfinger in the Great Smoky Mountains coupled with a few of Vinnie's brother's amazing hiking stories. In 2020, production started on the movie, with Luke Walker directing, Vinnie Vineyard producing and editing, and the entire cast (including Kandi Thompson, and Travis Graves) starring in the lead roles.

== Origins ==
Wrestling With Ghosts started when a paranormal investigator was eating at a restaurant in Gatlinburg, Tennessee. During the meal, he asked the manager on duty, Travis Graves, if there were any local ghost stories that would make for interesting television. Travis then referred him to a fellow employee, a long time resident, and former police officer Luke Walker. Walker had several stories and suggested than rather shooting one project in Gatlinburg for a documentary, that they should consider making a paranormal series. He then suggested that they should add entertainer Funkmaster V to the mix. The group then started shooting the series soon thereafter.

== Cast and crew ==
The permanent members of the cast and crew are Big Luke Walker, Funkmaster V, and Travis Graves.

- Big Luke Walker, born June 4, 1975, is the executive producer, head writer and camera operator on the show, and is originally from Bolingbrook, Illinois. Walker is an ex-police officer (a fact the team lampoons in episode one: "I Used to be a Cop".) In fact, his first experience with the paranormal was while he was performing his police duties at the Greenbrier Restaurant in Gatlinburg, Tennessee. He is also an ex-swat team member, long time singer/ songwriter, professional wrestler, podcaster and amateur gemologist.
- Vinnie Vineyard (Funkmaster V), born December 20, 1974, is the director, editor and writer of the show. He is originally from Baltimore, Maryland and was a long time resident of Knoxville, Tennessee. Vineyard goes by his wrestling moniker "Funkmaster V" on the show, which he obtained from his musical career as a bass player. He has been an on-air disc jockey, stand up comedian, professional wrestler, podcaster, libertarian politician, bounty hunter, state champion judoka and owns a taxi cab company "Funkmaster V's Uptown Cabs of Renown" that is featured in the show. Funkmaster V has his own segment of the show called "De-Funked". This is where the team investigates a legend or claim and see if it holds water.
- Travis Graves, born August 4, 1989, as Travis Sagraves in West Palm Beach, Florida, is a camera operator and on screen talent on the show. He is also a 16 year veteran pro-wrestler going by El Gordo Gringo.
- Kandi Thompson is a singer who joined the cast in Season 3.

== Guests and experts ==
- Mitchell Gore is a camera assistant who lives at a haunted location featured on episode 7.
- Kaitlin Shelton is a spirit medium. She is featured on a full segment on Episode 7 "The Furry Without a Fur Suit".
- Beth Gibson. She is predominately featured on Episode 4 "Going Postal", when on her birthday, spirits seemed to follow her around, throw objects at her, moan at her, and slam doors behind her.
- Perfect Pat is a wrestling promoter who knows the team from professional wrestling and was pivotal in allowing the team into Merrydeath Antiques, featured on episode 3 "Wee-Ji Want the Funk".
- Allan Miller is the docent of the Old La Follette Post Office and his retelling of local lore is featured on Episode 4 "Going Postal" and Episode 8, "The Postman Always Screams Twice".
- Hayley Stanley is a cosplayer that has helped the team when they needed someone to trigger misogynistic entities.
- Jenny Laurer helps the team on Episode 5 "The Giant Who Saved Gatlinburg" by putting a curse on the Mysterious Mansion and then reverses Funkmaster V's figure four leglock.
- Jeremy Cantelli is a camera operator who helped the team on segments of Episode 5, Episode 7, almost all of Episode 8, and all of Episode 6.
- Dalton Stout was a guest investigator on Episode 6 "The Rabbitman Cometh". He was the aggressive investigator that allegedly attacked other TV presenters during the famed "demonic attack" and this episode takes place at the same location of the incident. Eerily similarities ensue.
- Vito Thomselli of pro wrestling's The Thomaselli Brothers is the series narrator

== Episode list ==
Season One

- Ep. 1.1- "I Used to Be a Cop" Greenbriar Restaurant in Gatlinburg, TN. Defunked at the Sensabaugh Tunnel in Kingsport, TN
- Ep. 1.2- "Chiroptera Surgit" Undisclosed ghost town in Western North Carolina Smoky Mountains
- Ep. 1.3- "Wee-Ji Want the Funk" Merrydeath Antiques in La Follette, TN. Defunked at a personal residence in Stearns, KY
- Ep. 1.4- "Going Postal" Old La Follette Post Office in La Follette, TN. Defunked at the Roaring Fork Motor Nature Trail in Gatlinburg, TN.
- Ep. 1.5- "The Giant the Saved Gatlinburg" Various Gatlinburg Locations. Defunked at Emert's Cove Cemetery in Pittman Center, TN
- Ep. 1.6- "The Rabbitman Cometh" Rabbitman cabin, Unicoi TN.
- Bonus Ep. 1- "The Furry Without a Fur Suit" The House of Gore in Bristol, VA.
- Bonus Ep. 2- "The Postman Always Screams Twice" Return to the Old La Follette Post Office in La Follette, TN

Season Two

- Ep. 2.1- "Drag Me to Jail" Brushy Mountain State Penitentiary in Petros, TN.
- Ep. 2.2- "One Fish, BOO! Fish" Vollmar's Park, Bowling Green, OH.
- Ep. 2.3- "They Died With Their Boos On" Bethesda Presbyterian Church, Morristown, TN.
- Ep. 2.4- "Be Ghoul to Your Schuel" Poasttown Elementary, Middleton, OH.
- Ep. 2.5- "Dark Side of the Moonshine" Sevier Distilling Company, Sevierville, TN.
- Ep. 2.6- "Haleraiser" Hales Bar Dam, Near the Tennessee/ Georgia line.

Season Three

- Ep. 3.1- "Spearfinger" Nolan Creek Trail, NC
- Ep. 3.2- "Indian Cave" Vonore, TN
- Ep. 3.3- "Horsefly Chronicles" Easton, PA
- Ep. 3.4- "The Causey Light" Nichols, SC
- Ep. 3.5- "The Devil's Cemetery" Green Sea, SC
- Ep. 3.6- "The Historic Scott County Jail" Huntsville, TN
- Ep. 3.7- "The Ghost Town of Proctor" Proctor, NC

=== Notable arete ===
Walker and Vineyard were among several citizens who helped save lives and properties during the Gatlinburg Fires of November 28, 2016. Walker's Facebook live broadcast was the first report that Gatlinburg's Ski Mountain was on fire. meaning the city of Gatlinburg was surrounded by fire on all sides. His footage and interviews, along with Vineyard's, have been used in documentaries. One entitled "Firestorm", is being funded by HBO and is in post-production. Vineyard, who owns the taxi cab company "Funkmaster V's Uptown Cabs of Renown", went into Gatlinburg to rescue people who were trapped or overcome with smoke. The exploits of their night and their tag team match for charity can be seen on the last two segments of Wrestling With Ghosts season one - episode 5, "The Giant That Saved Gatlinburg".

=== Controversies ===
On the 5th episode, "The Giant That Saved Gatlinburg", some members of the team allegedly tampered with evidence as a joke. Although the show is heavily comedic, the remaining members of the show did not think the joke was professional. Walker said on a radio interview on Parasearch UK "You fake one thing, you faked everything." Some members of the cast and crew were replaced after this episode.

Walker and Vineyard host a Youtube series titled "Punch Tha South In Da Mouth" that expresses criticism of Southern culture and traditions in Tennessee. Despite their criticism of Tennessee, they have also expressed preference for living in East Tennessee over larger cities they hail from.

== Awards and recognition ==
2016 winners of Destination America's Parasearch competition for brand new Paranormal Team

2018 Wrestling With Ghosts was the most illegally downloaded show in Gabon, Africa.

2021 ASY TV's 2020 Year End Award "Biggest and Funkiest of 2020"

2025 TheSmokies.com rated Wrestling With Ghosts as the 6th best TV show filmed in the Great Smoky Mountains.

== See also ==
- List of reportedly haunted locations in the United States
- Paranormal television
- Truth Seekers
