= The Haunted (American TV series) =

American paranormal TV series

- The title screen of The Haunted
- Genre: Paranormal; Anthology; Horror; Animals; Mystery
- Developed by: Seth Browns
- Written by: Mike McPaters
- Directed by: Kevin Toods
- Narrated by: Steven Ryans
- Opening theme: The Haunted
- Ending theme: The Haunted
- Country of origin: United States
- Original language: English
- No. of seasons: 3
- No. of episodes: 26

Production
- Executive producer: Jake Browers
- Producer: Harry Millers
- Production location: United States
- Cinematography: David Miller
- Editor: David Millers
- Camera setup: motion camera
- Running time: 45 minutes
- Production company: Picture Shack Entertainment

Original release
- Network: Animal Planet
- Release: November 22, 2009 – May 13, 2011

The Haunted is an American paranormal television series that premiered on November 22, 2009, on Animal Planet. Produced by Picture Shack Entertainment, the program features ghost stories and paranormal investigations involving animals. It also incorporates actual footage and photographs from the families and paranormal research teams involved.

The series is now repeating on Destination America.

== Episodes ==
=== Season 1 (2009–2010) ===
No. overall	No. in season	Title	Original release date
1	1.01	"Lost Souls of the Asylum & The Curse of the Candle Shoppe"	November 22, 2009
Scott Township, Lackawanna County, Pennsylvania was a quiet community for the owners of a software company who were looking to expand their business. It was a place where they could find ample space at the right price. Little did they know, they were getting much more than they bargained for. As they found a nameplate with "The Blakely Home" they tried to get more information about that building and they discovered that it was, from 1919 - 1950, an insane asylum. As they went in the basement they found some cages, big enough to hold dogs, cats or other animals of that size. They also found some photos where rats were being dissected on lab tables. Weeks later, one of the motion sensors went off but just the one in front of the solitary confinement cells. The police couldn't find anyone in or near that building. Later two people started a candle-making business at a haunted building, where a doctor tested on primates. They remained in the shop and, as of 2011, are expanding to include a tour of the basement areas that were allegedly haunted.
2	1.02	"Murder at the Black Horse & Coven of the Cat"	November 29, 2009
When Al Stempo and his wife Maria purchased a 200-year-old building to open a new restaurant and bar, they had no idea they were buying a place that was rumored to be haunted. When several strange, unexplained incidents occur, Al and Maria brushed them off. But when their beloved Yorkie is found scared in the basement and the family Doberman has a vicious reaction to the restaurant's basement, Al and Maria decide to search for answers. They discover that the building was once the home to a notorious gangster who was shot and killed in their basement by a worker at the restaurant. With the revelation of compelling evidence discovered by paranormal team NEPA Paranormal, the Stempos come to believe that their building is indeed haunted by the gangster and that he is after their pets. Later, Rob Viars never took more than a passing interest in the history of his home until several frightening events forced him to take a closer look. After he and his wife see strange shadows and hear disembodied voices and their pets begin reacting to unseen entities, Rob calls in a paranormal investigation team to help them understand what was happening. When the team records the nightmarish wail of a ghostly cat, Rob's search for answers lead him to uncover the truth behind a cat-themed group and the rituals they performed in his formerly safe home.
3	1.03	"The Ghost Box Prophecies"	December 6, 2009
When Vicky Johnson's daughter decided to take up ghost hunting with some friends, she thought of it merely as an amusing hobby. But when her daughter returned from one particular site, an infamous abandoned hospital called the Henryton State Hospital which was known for mistreating patients, Vicky's home and her animals behavior changed drastically. Her once sweet dogs became violent and everyone in the house experienced strange activity in the basement. The family invites a paranormal team to their home and with their help come to the conclusion that something must have attached itself to Vicki's daughter during her ghost hunting when she was at the Henryton State Hospital. For more clues about the haunting, the team conducts a "ghost box" session with the family. During the session, the ghost box makes three horrific, deadly premonitions that begin to come true. A cleansing is done and the house returns to normal. The family takes in a dog who belonged to their murdered friend.
4	1.04	"Terror at Maple Dale Farm"	December 13, 2009
After an unidentifiable creature frightened her in the family's barn, Donna called in a team of paranormal investigators "Northwest Connecticut Paranormal Society". The investigators recorded strange voices in the barn at night. As they tried to uncover to whom that voice may belong, Donna learned that the activity might be tied to a horrible fire that destroyed the stables decades ago. With the help of an animal intuitive and communicator, Donna and her family are finally able to find peace and serenity in their home and barn.
5	1.05	"Demon House"	December 20, 2009
Jay and Elke Yaple have been waging a ceaseless war against the unseen forces occupying their two-hundred-year-old home. One day, she was resting with her dogs and her dogs were barking at something and it was a large, menacing, black demon dog. And one night, Elke heard these words come over the baby monitor: "You are all going to die!" Soon after, during an investigation, the Yaples heard a loud crash come from their children's bedroom. When they ran into the room they found bloody handprints on the baby's crib. Incredibly, there were no signs of blood anywhere on the children. Jay and Elke contacted CT Paranormal, who work closely with Father Bob Bailey, a priest and veteran demonologist. When they came to do an investigation Elke's older dog, Mandy, went into convulsions—seemingly possessed. Father Bob told Elke to put the dog down as they prayed to the Lord to protect the dog. The dog ceased shaking and returned to normal as the prayers finished. Father Bob then took on the entity, battling it with religion attempting to banish it from the home.
6	1.06	"The Possession of Cassie"	January 15, 2010
Julie, a single mother, and her two daughters, Cassie and Chante, along with their three dogs move into a large house. Cassie and Chante are excited about the move, but at their school, they are told that they live in a haunted house. This is further experienced on Halloween night, when trick-or-treaters completely avoid their house. The dogs act strangely, even wanting to stay outside in the cold. Things come to a head when Cassie sees a spectre in the nighttime. Scratches appear on Cassie's back. Julie begins to wonder about the history of the house, but when she looks for information, no one is willing to help her. The family move in with a friend of Julie's who lives in a small apartment, with their animals, but the animals create too much ruckus. Julie, Cassie and Chante take the dogs back to the house; and later the house is trashed. Julie contacts the Chippewa Valley Paranormal Investigators, and they conduct an investigation. One of the investigators is scratched very similar to the way Cassie was during the investigation. They uncover a record of a mysterious suicide. The team returns to do a smudging of the house. During this time Cassie is possessed and tries to attack her mother, they try to bless her, but every time she becomes more hostile and they have to take her outside. Julie, Cassie and Chante eventually find a new home and move there, never looking back.
7	1.07	"Leave House"	January 22, 2010
Laura met Roger, they fell in love and married. After Laura moves into Roger's home strange things begin to happen. The animals start to exhibit strange behavior, the cat were watching in the air like she was following something and the dogs were barking and growling. Laura sees a figure, and finds words carved into the wall behind a picture. Laura is afraid, but Roger is skeptical. This begins to cause a rift in their marriage. Things continue to get worse, with multiple people witnesses events, except Roger, causing Roger and Laura to grow apart. Eventually, Laura and Roger discover that their house is haunted by the ghost of a Civil War soldier.
8	1.08	"Lady in White & Thump in the Night"	January 29, 2010
Tom and Deborah are living in Cleveland, Ohio, they were living in the house for 12 years. After Deborah's friend Darlene and Chelsea move in, strange things started to happen. At first the dogs were barking and watching nothing. However, Chelsea saw a female figure, and later Deborah witnesses a strange occurrence. Tom remained skeptical until he saw the female entity, leading Darlene to confess that Chelsea is clairvoyant and can see ghosts since she was a child. While conducting research on the property, a paranormal research team discovers that the female entity wasn't causing any harm to Chelsea and the others. During an EVP session, the researchers learn that she's grateful that her home is cared for by Tom and Deborah and had been watching over them. The team and Chelsea helps cross her spirit over. In Toledo, Ohio, Brian and Annie are living a really nice life. Sadly, Annie is unable to have children so they bought some rabbits and a cat. After marriage they start to restore the house. After that, the rabbits were thumping at night and it seems the rabbits start to get sick, they won't eat or drink so they went to a vet but all the test were negative, but then a short time later the rabbits died and nobody could explain why. So Annie calls in a paranormal research team and the psychic claims that the house's history involves a murdered woman. Though they were able to cleanse the house, the team warns Brian and Annie to be more careful in their renovations.
9	1.09	"The Door & A Place to Die"	February 5, 2010
After leaving California, a mother, Laza, and her two kids, Neissa and Cheshnia, were looking for a fresh start back in the north-east. They were thrilled when they stumbled on the ideal home. Everything seemed to fall in the right place. A short time after they got a dog named Lestont. Laza and her boyfriend Jacob were sleeping but then, out of a sudden, the dog was on the staircase and barks to the top of it. Jacob was looking for the dog but he couldn't find the source of his barking. The next day, Lestont was with Neissa in her room and then he starts to bark at the door, he was ready to attack, and the doorknob was turning, like somebody wants to get in. About two hours away from Laza's old home, The Pennsylvania Paranormal Association, P.P.A. were working on another case. At the home of retired police officer Fern M. He and his wife Nicole decided to move their family out of the city. They bought a ranch and many animals for it. Six horses and six dogs. Murphy, one of the dogs, was with Nicole and her daughter in the kitchen, taking some photos he starts to bark at the refrigerator, they took a photo and they found something unusual on it, Murphy stops barking and they took another one and it was gone. She contacts a paranormal team, and soon one of the investigators says the house they are living in is a place animals were sent to by God to die peacefully.
10	1.10	"Leave Or Die & Ghost Town"	February 19, 2010
When Gloria and Roy Solis look at a house in El Dorado, Oklahoma, they see a message on the side of the house that said, "Leave or Die". Thinking the house was vandalized, they decide to go ahead and buy the house. But one time during the Christmas season, when Gloria went into the kitchen, she hears an inhuman growl. Two weeks later, Gloria and Roy were sleeping, when they wake up, Roy's hair starts falling out in clumps, with a stinging feeling on his head. And then he sees a cross drawn on Gloria's forehead. They contact OKPRI. After a while, one investigator (whose identity was concealed), becomes demonically possessed. Months later, the team returns with demonologist Carl Johnson. They do a house blessing to attempt to banish it from the house. When they come to the backyard, a bunch of shadows start scurrying in the yard. Several months later, the family moved into a new house. Their dog, Pongo, grew all his hair back (for he began losing his hair in their old home). Their old home is now vacant. Kim Birgfeld and her daughter Katharyn move into a house in Riegelsville, Pennsylvania that once was a hotel and a brothel. They heard rumors that it was haunted, but they didn't believe it. Katharyn sees a man. The family cat is shoved down the stairs by an unseen force. Katharyn also gets pushed down the stairs. She calls the Eastern Pennsylvania Paranormal Society and they decided to look through historical records after encountering the spirit of a frightening-looking man that said "whiskey". A priest visits and tells Kim about the town's history and informs her of the other residents similar encounters. It's only then she learns that her house and the entire town was built on Unami burial grounds. Upon leaning more about this, the team solicit the assistance of Miguel Saguè to cross the spirits over.

=== Season 2 (2010) ===
No. overall	No. in season	Title	Original release date
11	2.1	"The Demonic Seduction"	October 3, 2010
In a small New England town, a father of two found out the hard way that to barge in on the paranormal could be dangerous. Jake is a paranormal investigator, and one time when he was on an investigation, it seems there was a succubus that took over Jake and followed him home. The nightmare begins for him. His family dog becomes more aggressive towards him. They started to hear ungodly screams coming from the back yard. Jake also starts to get attacked every night. Eventually, he decides to get his team over to his house to perform a deliverance. He must fight for his life.
12	2.2	"Demon Attack"	October 10, 2010
Orange, MA is where Michelle, a single mother, met and fell in love with a man named Harvey. The two were quickly married and planned to start a family. One day Brianna told her sister about a friend she was talking to and he was bleeding, later she came to her mother and told her she have to make her puppets eyes stop to bleed. Michelle calls in a paranormal research team to investigate her home. The team discovers that Brianna is clairvoyant and is the target of the malevolent entity. During an investigation, the ghostbox claims itself as Maggie. When demonologist Carl Johnson is called in, he quickly discovers the entity is demonic. When the demon possesses one of the researchers during the deliverance, the fight is on to save his soul.
13	2.3	"The Bloody Man"	October 17, 2010
Duncannon, Pennsylvania, a sleepy little town, located on the Susquehanna River. With three growing children, Laura and Brad began searching for a new home. One night Laura was dreaming of a house, the children were playing there, after one year they found the same house from Laura's dream, so they bought it. They had to do some renovation, after starting that the paranormal activity began. It is believed that renovations disturb or reawaken spirits and ghosts because they see it as their living place and they want it to remain as it was. The animals became frightened, seemingly pushed by an unseen force. Because the activity seems to affect also the children, Laura started to do some research of the house. After a phone call from two women, she found out that an abusive and disturbed man, actually the women's grandfather, inhabited the house before being taken away from his home. A psychic medium is called in to talk to the women's grandfather in the basement. She makes a deal with his soul that she won't remove him as long as he agrees to co-exist with Laura and her family by not bothering them anymore. The grandfather accepts the medium's deal and things return to normal.
14	2.4	"Return From The Grave"	October 24, 2010
Few of us get second chances in life, but when Deanna and Tom, two previously married people found each other, fell in love and moved to a quiet north-eastern town. In their house, one of the bedrooms was modified for Tom as a den, and he kept it locked because of the weapons he had in there. Their cat, Skittles hides in the closet from something that cannot be seen. After Skittles' death, they welcome two new cats into the family, but they start to act like Skittles did. They both manage to open the door to Tom's den even though it is always locked. The family constantly hears loud, gunshot-like banging noises. They also hear voices and a shrieking yell that calls for help. After their cat is thrown down the steps, Deanna cannot take it any longer and calls a paranormal team. They discover that a boy who enjoyed to torture cats had committed suicide in the basement. A neighbor confirms this by mentioning that when the boy's family found out about his obsession and punished him for it by banning him from getting another cat to torture, he took his anger out on them by killing himself. Deanna realizes why no one told them about the house out of fear the boy's soul would come to attack them as well. The team returns to bless the house and convince the boy's spirit to cross over to face God's judgment.
15	2.5	"Closet of Horror & Told to Die"	October 31, 2010
Berlinsville, Pennsylvania for generations was home to Sharon Green's family. The two were quickly married and planned to start a family. They got a dog, the dog was really happy when he is outside, but when he came into the house he starts to act different. Over the years Sharon watched some unusual things happen in the house, things were moving, lights are going on and off and knocks on the walls. Sharon was thinking to lose her mind, so she kept quiet about the things that were happening. What the mother didn't know was, his son, Andrew, has also had paranormal experience. After hearing several voices that responded to questions, they discover that there is the spirit of a mentally-challenged boy who was locked in the closet. Lights Out Paranormal, a ghost-hunting group, manage to cross the boy over. About 50 miles down the road from Sharon and Andrew, Seth decided to start a new life for himself in Shillington, Pennsylvania. His girlfriend, Jess, and her son, Silas, were looking forward to a happy future together. But it turned out another way. Jess and Silas were running out of the house back her mother, she refused to stay in that house. Quest Paranormal Society has come and cleansed the house.
16	2.6	"Land of Misery"	November 7, 2010
A family discovers a bone in their backyard and after that things inside the house begin to turn unusual things are happening, when one family member was alone inside the house, he saw someone at the door. They contracted a paranormal team to begin to cleanse the house after the things that were happening inside the house and things returned to normal.
17	2.7	"The Touch of Death"	November 14, 2010
In Saranac Lake, New York, Mike is a real estate investor who buys and sells apartment buildings. He met Jen when she was looking for a place to live. Shortly after she moved in they got married and they renovated their place together. Soon Jen saw a change in the dog's behavior, she started also to see dark figures and hear tapping and scratching on the window. One night she heard someone walking in the apartment, but she knew normally there shouldn't be someone, so she decided to look for it, as she went into the room she saw nothing it was dark and the room hasn't any electricity yet but the out of the black a white hand was grabbing her face. They would later discover that their home was haunted by countless entities who died from a massive tuberculosis breakout in the town.
18	2.8	"Dead In The Water & Curse of the Evil"	November 21, 2010
Travis, Jenny and their young son, Andrew live in Chippewa Falls, Wisconsin. They begin to experience strange occurrences in their new home. They often return home to find things in disarray. They find their Golden Retrievers to be locked up when they had let them out earlier. They adopt a new pet cat, which Andrew names "Georgie." When Jenny sees a spectre, she and Travis contact the Chippewa Valley Paranormal Investigators. The family discovers their house is haunted by a spirit of a little boy named Georgie who drowned in a nearby pond, and is buried on their property. The CVPI suggest they put up a new plaque and redo the funeral rites for him. With the help of the investigators, the family agrees and this helps Georgie cross over for good. In a suburban town of Hamden, Connecticut; Debbie lives in her house with her two cats and two dogs. Feeling lonesome, Debbie decides to get a new roommate. Their relationship quickly becomes tense as she is caught practicing witchcraft. Unexplainable events start happening, and one of Debbie's cats, Morris, strangely disappears. A couple of days later, her roommate suddenly moves out. Several months later, Debbie encounters a presence in the house and seems to be dogged by unfortunate events. Seeking help from John, an expert in the paranormal field, he is at first skeptical, thinking Debbie is lonely and going through some bad luck. After realizing what Debbie was going through, John decides to bring his team to the house and measure the EMF. John discovers that she had taken in a roommate who delved into witchcraft and she was cursed from it. They decide to summon Rev. Larry Elward, a priest and an exorcist; and Debra, a clairvoyant and a psychic, to cleanse the house from a curse. Soon after the exorcism, the house was blessed to prevent the evil spirits from returning.
19	2.9	"House of the Rising Dead"	December 3, 2010
Karla and her kids living in New Orleans, Louisiana after losing her house in Hurricane Katrina. Shortly after moving in, Karla discovers disturbing Egyptian artwork in a servant's room. After that, strange occurrences frighten the family. As they renovate they start to find more strange objects, including a puddle of blood, a half-torn human bone, shattering mirrors, and Karla being pushed down the marble steps. Karla's sister Krista doesn't believe her until she is injured after being pushed down the stairs. Karla contacts paranormal investigator Kalila Smith. Later, the family finds out about a ritualistic group that formerly lived there to practice animal sacrifices.
20	2.10	"Invasion of the Poltergeist & Relative Evil"	December 10, 2010
In Delaware County, Pennsylvania. Sharan, along with her three kids, finds a new house on the block and decides to move in. One night, one of their neighbors makes a strange comment about someone walking across the upstairs bedroom's window. Their cat, Samantha, began to behave oddly shortly after moving into the home. The next few nights, Sharan begins hearing noises coming from the attic. Several weeks later, her fiancé Gus moves in and they marry. Soon after, they have a new baby. Unexplained things started happening in the next few weeks. They summon paranormal investigators and a psychic to determine what is haunting the family. Eventually, they recite a prayer allowing the spirits to cross over. After the prayers, the house returned to normal.

=== Season 3 (2011) ===
No. overall	No. in season	Title	Original release date
21	3.01	"Monster in the Closet"	April 1, 2011
This is the Season 2 premiere. In Oklahoma, a family moves into a home and starts their lives. During their childhood, the two children suffered from unexplained experiences for 20 years, as they both saw a shadow with bright red eyes in the bedroom closet and the daughter's cat died. Their parents don't know about this until they both are attacked in bed as a deep voice yells, "Get out!". The family calls upon a paranormal team and demonologist to help, later discovering of multiple murders in the house. When they try to banish the entity from the home, it violently possesses their daughter, and literally enters her body. They banish the demonic entity and the house turns back to normal. This episode features the Oklahoma paranormal team OKPRI, many members of which are now Society of the Haunted.
22	3.02	"You Must Die Tonight"	April 8, 2011
A family who lived in a rural area noticed unusual things going on like laughing, talking, and stomping from a disembodied entity. Jeremy Jones and other team Members of TPI recorded Flashing Lights emitting from no-where, question's answered through the TPI Flashlight Experiment and voices of a little girl during an EVP Session. They called a local paranormal team Texas Paranormal Investigations (TPI). They contact a local historian and discover the gruesome history of an axe murder that took place in the house. They then decided to call Father Bob Bailey to bless the house after hearing a voice say You must die tonight in an angry voice, but the spirits would not leave, so they perform a deliverance to rid the house from all of the spirits.
23	3.03	"Bone Crusher"	April 15, 2011
A family moved in a home where unusual things were happening. There was one evening where a family member went down to the basement to fix the power box and heard loud laughter. One morning, a family member found a bone in their backyard. One family member's co worker broke the bone and it made things worse. The Pennsylvania Paranormal Association was called and the team introduced a psychic to the case. After discovering that the backyard was a former church graveyard, they called a priest from a nearby church to bless the house and the backyard. After the blessing, the house felt better and peaceful.
24	3.04	"Don't Go In The Attic"	April 22, 2011
A family moves into a 300-year-old house when the fear their house is inhabited by a previous owner. Their German Shepherd Princess behaves abnormally inside the house and is fearful going into the attic. This forces the father into giving her up to another family, they later obtain two more dogs from a shelter, but the two dogs also go through the same behavior. Their daughter, during a sleepover with a friend, spends the night at her friend's house after they hear footsteps and spot a shadow figure standing in the doorway. They contact Pennsylvania Paranormal Association for help. They find out their house is haunted by multiple spirits.
25	3.05	"Stalked by a Vampire"	May 6, 2011
Michelle and her large family moves into a perfect home in Maryland after receiving a weird phone call. Michelle and her daughter see a black mist that seems to drain their energy. They move into a new house after the activity gets very bad, but it start up again after two weeks. They contact Paranormal Research and Investigation Society of Maryland. They find out that their first home was owned by an ancestor of their family. Demonologist Carl Johnson identifies this entity as an energy vampire and blesses the house in order to remove it.
26	3.06	"Murder in Room 12"	May 13, 2011
Lauren and Ron decide to open an inn in New York. Soon after moving in, their cat started acting strange. In room 12, there was a terrible smell always present that couldn't be explained. Guests complained about their TV being on, but no one could be found who turned it on. They had a guest in room 12 that went berserk for no good reason, and had to be taken away. Lauren and Ron found out about a murder that happened to a woman in room 12. With this information, they reached out Pennsylvania Paranormal Association. Psychic Virginia Centrillo made an attempt to cross this entity over.

== See also ==
- Ghost hunting
- Haunted house
- List of reportedly haunted locations
- Paranormal television
