= Spøgelsesjægerne =

Danish reality TV show

Spøgelsesjægerne ("The Ghosthunters") is a Danish reality TV show, produced by Blu and aired on Kanal 5 which follows two Danish ghost hunter groups. Unlike many other paranormal television shows, Spøgelsesjægerne does not focus exclusively on the groups' paranormal investigations but also covers the group members' private lives.

== Premise ==
The show follows two groups of paranormal investigators - namely, the Jutland-based group Ghosthunting.dk and the Zealand-based groups Dansk Parapsykologisk Aspekt (DPA). As is typical of paranormal reality TV, Spøgelsesjægerne covers the groups' paranormal investigations and draws on the aesthetics of the genre, such as night camera green and documentary style cutting. However, the show also covers aspects of the day-to-day operations of the two groups.

For instance, the first episode covers an entrance examination for two potential new members of Ghosthunting.dk in the form of a mock ghost hunt (with only one of the two candidates passing), and episode two covers both groups' selection processes when they decide which locations to investigate. Episode 5 infamously covers a team building exercise in which a sexologist therapist coaches DPA in an unconventional manner (the sexologist controversially crashes an investigation in a private home in episode 6), and also depicts the on-camera dismissal of Ghosthunting.dk's researcher from the group. Episode 6 covers documents Ghosthunting.dk experimenting with "ånden i glasset" (a Danish variant of ouija), while a new member is inducted into DPA and put through a trial of fire.

Moreover, the show covers aspects of the members' private lives, with episode 4 showing one of DPA's members dropping off his Thai girlfriend at the airport, and episode 3 depicting Ghosthunting.dk's researcher's dating activities. Episode 6 depicts an emotional clairvoyance session in which some of Ghosthunting.dk's members make contact with the spirits of dead family members, while episode 2 shows DPA's Chief Investigator in his day job as a mechanic in the local fire department, and episode 5 follows Ghosthunting.dk's leader's trip to the local supermarket. The romantic relationship between Ghosthunting.dk's leader and his long-term partner, who is also a member of the group, is a recurring theme.

== Viewer interaction ==
Both DPA and Ghosthunting.dk openly communicate with the show's viewers. Both groups participate in the show's official chat channel, and Ghosthunting.dk have an additional channel on their own website, and also do live online broadcasts in which the group's members answer questions and respond to comments from the show's viewers. Both groups also interact with viewers via Facebook, DPA using a Facebook-group and Ghosthunting.dk using a Facebook-page.
