= Wild Life (TV series) =

American adult animated sitcom

- Genre: Adult animation Animated sitcom
- Created by: Adam Davies
- Written by: Adam Davies; Dylan Dawson; Alex Plapinger
- Directed by: Griffith Kimmins
- Creative director: Evan Viera
- Voices of: Rhys Darby; Dylan Dawson; Tim Heidecker; Claudia O'Doherty; SkittLeZ Ortiz; Natalie Palamides; John Reynolds; Peter Serafinowicz; Baron Vaughn; Reggie Watts
- Composer: Alex Plapinger
- Country of origin: United States
- Original language: English
- No. of seasons: 1
- No. of episodes: 6

Production
- Executive producers: Adam Davies; Dylan Dawson; Alex Plapinger; David Carrico; Adam Paulsen; Isaac Krauss; Dave Newberg
- Producer: Dave Newberg
- Animators: Nick Bane; Victoria Giacomazzi; Sebastian Leverette; Tessa Lowe; Karli Medler; Forrest E Norris III; Daran Sudric; Dante Tumminello; Zachary Wells
- Editor: Jeff Picarello
- Running time: 15 minutes
- Production companies: Nice Try. Octopie Network; Valparaiso Pictures; TZGZ Productions

Original release
- Network: Syfy
- Release: September 26 – October 31, 2020

Wild Life is an American adult animated sitcom created by Adam Davies that premiered on September 26, 2020, on Syfy's late-night programming block, TZGZ. It is an animated show about a gang of zoo critters living free and hanging out after the end of the world. The season one finale aired on October 31.

== Plot ==
Wild Life is "a show about animal friends just trying to stay alive after the apocalypse. Together, they come up with elaborate schemes to entertain themselves and pretty much just keep from going insane".

== Cast and characters ==
- John Paul Reynolds as Glenn
- Claudia O'Doherty as Marny
- Baron Vaughn as Hudson
- Reggie Watts as Darby
- SkittLeZ Ortiz as Debbie
- Natalie Palamides as Viv

== Episodes ==
No.	Title	Directed by	Written by	Original release date	Prod. code	U.S. viewers (millions)
1	"Bad Water"	Griffith Kimmins	Adam Davies, Dylan Dawson & Alex Plapinger	September 26, 2020	TBA	0.177
The critters have to go to the mall to save the zoo!
2	"We Bot a Zoo"	Griffith Kimmins	Adam Davies, Dylan Dawson & Alex Plapinger	October 3, 2020	TBA	0.109
Darby makes everyone robot versions of themselves.
3	"Zook Club"	Griffith Kimmins	Adam Davies, Dylan Dawson & Alex Plapinger	October 10, 2020	TBA	0.128
Debbie takes over Glenn's beloved book club.
4	"Doug The Bear"	Griffith Kimmins	Adam Davies, Dylan Dawson & Alex Plapinger	October 17, 2020	TBA	0.098
The zoo crew gets obsessed with tennis and befriend a cool bear.
5	"Broadcast Zoos"	Griffith Kimmins	Adam Davies, Dylan Dawson & Alex Plapinger	October 24, 2020	TBA	0.199
The critters find an abandoned broadcast studio and starts making shows.
6	"A River Runs Zoo It"	Griffith Kimmins	Adam Davies, Dylan Dawson & Alex Plapinger	October 31, 2020	TBA	0.135
The critters go tubing on the river and Marny meets a fellow dolphin.

== Production ==
=== Development ===
Wild Life was announced as part of the first efforts of Syfy to create original programming for its TZGZ block, with a 15-minute pilot ordered in January 2020. In April of the same year, the pilot was greenlit to series, with Syfy ordering five 15-minute episodes.

According to show creator Adam Davies, the idea, born in 2016, came from his love for animals, but also thinking there's a tension between them and humans, wanting to give them a voice because of that. The selection of animals as the main cast came when Davies started drawing cheetah spots to process trauma (which would become Glenn), with the rest of the cast and setting coming as a "subconscious thing".

Two inspirations for the show, according to executive producer Dylan Dawson, are comic strip Calvin and Hobbes and stop-motion series Creature Comforts.

=== Crew ===
The series is produced by Valparaiso Pictures, with animation outsourced to Octopie. According to executive producer Alex Plapinger, the number of people who worked on the show are between 40 and 50, with a lot of people working in various areas of production. The animation is done on Adobe Animate.

=== Cast ===
The main cast was announced the same day the pilot was greenlit to series, conformed by Natalie Palamides, Baron Vaughn, Reggie Watts, John Paul Reynolds, Claudia O'Doherty and SkittLeZ Ortiz.

=== Release ===
The first sneak peek of the show was released during Comic-Con on July 24, 2020, alongside a panel with members of the crew and cast. The series premiered on September 26, 2020, alongside the debut of Magical Girl Friendship Squad.
