= List of programmes broadcast by Sky Sci-Fi =

This list represents television programmes that have aired on the Sky Sci-Fi channel (formerly Sci Fi Channel and Syfy) in the United Kingdom.

== Former programming ==
=== Acquired programming ===
- Alphas
- Andromeda
- The Ark (series 1–2)
- Blood & Treasure
- Century City
- Chucky (series 1–2)
- Continuum
- Dark Matter
- Day Of The Dead
- Eastwick
- Eli Stone
- Firefly
- Flash Gordon
- From (series 1–2) (Note: Moved to Sky Max for series 3 and Sky One for series 4–5)
- Heroes
- Human Target
- The Incredible Hulk
- John Doe
- Killjoys
- Knight Rider
- La Femme Nikita
- The Librarians
- The Lost World
- Medium
- Monstrous
- Mysterious Ways
- Mystery Science Theater 3000
- The Outpost
- Pandora
- Poltergeist: The Legacy
- The Pretender
- Profiler
- Project Blue Book
- Push, Nevada
- Reginald the Vampire
- Reverie
- SeaQuest DSV
- The Sentinel
- She Spies
- Siren
- The Six Million Dollar Man
- Sliders
- Spawn
- Star Trek: The Animated Series
- Star Trek: Deep Space Nine
- Star Trek: Enterprise
- Star Trek: The Next Generation
- Star Trek: Voyager
- Stitchers
- SurrealEstate (series 1–2) (Note: Moved to Tubi for series 3)
- Swamp Thing
- The Swarm
- A Town Called Eureka
- Train
- Trickster
- Tru Calling
- The Twilight Zone (1959)
- The Twilight Zone (2019)
- V
- Vagrant Queen
- Warehouse 13
- Wonder Woman
- Wynonna Earp

== Second-run programming ==
The majority of programming listed below previously aired on other Sky UK channels. The list includes both Sky originals and acquired programming.

- 3rd Rock from the Sun (Note: Previously aired on either BBC One or BBC Two)
- Atlantis
- The Baby
- The Bionic Woman (Note: Previously aired on ITV)
- Blake's 7
- Britannia
- Buffy the Vampire Slayer
- CSI: Miami
- The Day of the Triffids
- A Discovery of Witches
- Doctor Who
- Evil
- Fantasy Island
- Farscape
- Fortitude
- Fringe (Note: Previously aired on Fox UK)
- From the Earth to the Moon
- Futurama
- Grimm (Note: Previously aired on W)
- Intergalactic
- It
- Knightmare
- La Brea
- The Last Train
- The Leftovers
- Lois & Clark: The New Adventures of Superman
- The Lost Symbol
- Lovecraft Country
- Manifest
- Merlin
- Most Haunted
- The Outsider
- Penny Dreadful: City of Angels
- Primeval
- Quantum Leap
- Resident Alien
- Revival
- The Rising
- Room 104
- Roswell
- Small Town, Big Story
- Space Precinct
- Stan Lee's Lucky Man
- Stargate Atlantis
- Stargate SG-1
- Stargate Universe
- Tales of the Unexpected
- Thunderbirds
- True Blood
- Twin Peaks: The Return
- UFO
- The Walking Dead
- The Walking Dead: The Ones Who Live
- Watchmen
- Westworld

== See also ==
- List of programs broadcast by Syfy
