= Haunted Encounters =

- Also known as: Haunted Encounters: Face to Face
- Genre: Paranormal; Reality TV
- Starring: Chelsea Damali; Daniel Hooven; Josh "Helmey" Kramer; Jordan Murphy
- Composer: Raney Shockne
- Country of origin: United States
- Original language: English
- No. of seasons: 1
- No. of episodes: 5

Production
- Executive producers: Casey Brumels; Brad Kuhlman
- Cinematography: Douglas Cheney
- Editors: James Cude; Fernando Herrara; Paul Morzella; Nick Termini; Malinda Zehner
- Camera setup: Paul Mayne
- Running time: 45 minutes
- Production company: Ping Pong Productions

Original release
- Network: Biography Channel
- Release: December 1 – December 28, 2012

Haunted Encounters (also known as Haunted Encounters: Face to Face) is an American paranormal television series that premiered on December 1, 2012, on the Biography Channel. The program features a paranormal investigation team, the Paranormal Syndicate, that investigates haunted hotspots that are the list of reportedly haunted locations and gather evidence to prove that it is haunted. Episodes aired at 10:00PM EST.

== Cast and crew ==
Investigation team: Paranormal Syndicate

- Daniel Hooven - Lead Investigator
- Josh "Helmey" Kramer - Technical Specialist
- Chelsea Damali - Psychic/Medium
- Captain - K9 Investigator
- Jordan Murphy - Case Manager

== Series overview ==
Season	Episodes	Originally released	
Season	Episodes	First released	Last released
1	5	December 1, 2012	December 28, 2012

== Episodes ==
No.	Title	Location	Original release date
1	"Lizzie Borden/Silent Movie Theater"	Lizzie Borden Murder House, Fall River, Massachusetts; Silent Movie Theatre, Hollywood, California	November 30, 2012
"The Lizzie Borden Murders": The series preimere features the investigation team known as the Paranormal Syndicate conduct a paranormal investigation of the Lizzie Borden Murder House, home of one of history's most infamous and brutal murders. "The Silent Theater Hauntings": They also investigate a haunted silent movie theater, one of Hollywood's most historic landmarks, with the help of their canine investigator, Captain.
2	"Black Dahlia/Boston's Haunted Underworld"	Black Dahlia Murder House, Los Angeles, California; Boston Common, Boston, Massachusetts	October 8, 2012
"The Black Dahlia Murder House": The Paranormal Syndicate first heads to the City of Angels to investigate a house believed to be the site of the infamous Black Dahlia murder. "Boston's Haunted Underworld": Next, the team travels to Beantown where they gain exclusive access into a system of long-abandoned subway tunnels deep beneath the city that once served as the epicenter to tragedies and death for over a century.
3	"Eastern State Penitentiary"	Eastern State Penitentiary, Philadelphia, Pennsylvania	December 15, 2012
"Eastern State Penitentiary": The Paranormal Syndicate is granted unprecedented access to investigate one of the world's most infamous prisons, Eastern State Penitentiary, where thousands of criminals lost their lives. Inmates committed suicide, tortured, murdered, and died of many illnesses within the walls of this historic prison. And it is believed that many of their restless souls are imprisoned here for all eternity.
4	"Ghosts of Skid Row/Kreischer Mansion"	Hotel Cecil, Los Angeles, California; Kreischer Mansion, Staten Island, New York	December 22, 2012
"The Ghosts on Skid Row": The Paranormal Syndicate heads to downtown Los Angeles to investigate Hotel Cecil, which served as a hideout for two of history's most notorious serial killers during their reign of terror of murders and rapes. "Staten Island Hauntings": Next, the team travels to Staten Island to investigate the Kreischer Mansion, home to many tragedies and reports of paranormal activity, including full-bodied apparitions believed to the deceased Kreischer family members.
5	"Houghton Mansion/St. Marks"	Houghton Mansion, North Adams, Massachusetts; St. Marks Church in the Bowery, New York City, New York	December 28, 2012
"Ghosts of the Masonic Temple": The Paranormal Syndicate heads to North Adams to investigate the Houghton Mansion that's the headquarters of a mysterious Masonic temple. The estate was once home to a series of tragedies and has since become infamous for frequent paranormal activity, including reports of shadow figures, apparitions, and phantom footsteps. "Manhattan's Most Haunted Church": Next, the team travels to New York City to investigate Manhattan's second oldest church, St. Marks Church-in-the-Bowery, a landmark that has a dark history tainted with body snatching and hundreds of disturbed graves.

== See also ==
- Apparitional experience
- Ghost hunting
- List of ghost films
- List of reportedly haunted locations in the United States
- Parapsychology
