= Haunted USA =

- Also known as: Haunted U.S.A.
- Genre: Paranormal; Reality TV
- Narrated by: Glenn Steinbaum
- Country of origin: United States
- Original language: English
- No. of seasons: 1
- No. of episodes: 4

Production
- Executive producers: Steve McClaughlin; Dominic Stobart; Edward Hambleton
- Producer: Dan Howlett
- Editors: Marco Gonzales; Athena Lemakis; Alden MacKay; Rose Margolis; Chris Schoedel
- Running time: 45 minutes
- Production company: Optomen Productions

Original release
- Network: Travel Channel
- Release: October 8 – October 29, 2017

Haunted USA is an American paranormal television series that premiered on October 8, 2017 in the United States on the Travel Channel. The 4-part special series featured allegedly haunted cities or towns in America and their "darker side". Each episode focused on visitors claiming to encounter restless spirits, fearsome entities, and vengeful ghosts in allegedly haunted locations. Interviews with paranormal investigators, supernatural shop owners and ghost hunting tourists were featured.

== Episodes ==
No.	Title	Location	Original release date
1	"New Orleans"	New Orleans, Louisiana	October 8, 2017
In the series premiere, tourists journey through Crescent City locations, including La Petit Thèâtre, a supposedly haunted playhouse; "Cities of the Dead" (aboveground cemeteries of the Big Easy); Manchac Swamp, home to the curse of voodoo doctor Julia Brown; Boutique du Vampyre; New Orleans Secrets Tours (séances at North Rampart Street townhouse); House at 1022 Royal Street (Ghost City Tours); The Mortuary (a real haunted attraction); Muriel's Jackson Square Bistro; and The Andrew Jackson Hotel.
2	"Salem"	Salem, Massachusetts	October 15, 2017
Tourists travel to Salem, Massachusetts, a.k.a. "Witch City", home of the Salem Witch Trials of 1692. Sites include: Witch Trials Memorial; 194 Cabot Street (former Odd Fellows headquarters, now Black Veil Studios tattoo parlor; Crow Haven Corner, a witch shop; Lizzie Borden Bed & Breakfast in Fall River, home to axe-murder victims; Gallows Hill, where accused witches were hanged; Old Burying Point, a graveyard claimed to be haunted by infant spirits who died of smallpox; and Saint Peter's Episcopal Church, where it is claimed the ghost of Peter English still lingers.
3	"New York"	New York City, New York	October 22, 2017
Tourists make their way through New York, the "City that Never Sleeps". Sites include: Grand Central Terminal's The Campbell Bar; Rolling Hills Asylum in East Bethany; the townhouse on Mulberry Street (home to a psychic medium for celebrities); Morris-Jumnel Mansion, where a wife allegedly left her husband to die after a carriage accident; the Merchant's House, said to be haunted by its former owner; the Shanley Hotel in Napanoch, claimed to be haunted by a little girl who drowned in a well; and Fort Totten in Queens.
4	"Savannah"	Savannah, Georgia	October 29, 2017
Tourists travel to the low country of Savannah, claimed to be "one of the most haunted cities in the country". Sites include; the Gribble House where a triple axe murder took place in 1909; The Pirate's House, a 250 year old establishment that has tunnels leading to the river; The Moon River Brewing Company, a building built in 1864 which once served as a hotel and a hospital during a yellow fever epidemic.
