= The Past Hunters =

The Past Hunters is a paranormal television show and its new series aired a 12 part series on Fox's YourTV and launched on the channel December 14, 2015.

During August 2015, a clip from The Past Hunters episode at Tutbury Castle went viral around the world and gained a huge amount of hits on YouTube as a ghost seem to appear to walk across a wall on camera and major newspapers globally

Led by Psychic Medium Derek Acorah, Bex Palmer, and Sean Reynolds and joined by team members Dave Hart, Jason Townsley, Carl Joyce, and Natalie Garstang. The show's presenters head into haunted locations around the UK in the search for paranormal activity.

During the week December 21 to 27, 2015, the show gained number one most watched show that week for the channel.
