= Deep South Paranormal =

American paranormal television series

- Genre: Paranormal
- Theme music composer: Keith Ramsey; Travis Greer
- Country of origin: United States
- Original language: English
- No. of seasons: 1
- No. of episodes: 6

Production
- Executive producers: John Brenkus; Mickey Stern; Carlos Contreras
- Cinematography: Nick Tramontano
- Editors: Alex Dollins; Greg Myers; Gadi Muriciano; Gary Reid; Joe Rogan; Alan Wain; Mathys Willem
- Production company: Thunder Road Productions

Original release
- Network: Syfy
- Release: April 10 – May 15, 2013

Deep South Paranormal is an American paranormal television series on Syfy that debuted April 10, 2013. As of June 2014, the series has been cancelled.

== Summary ==
The series featured the Deep South Paranormal team, a group of ghost hunters from the Deep South who followed their paranormal investigations to different reportedly haunted locations in the Southern United States .

== Cast ==
Deep South Pararnormal team:

- Hart Fortenbery — The Godfather
- Jonathan Hodges — Team leader
- Benny Reed — The Joker
- Randy Hardy — The Daredevil
- Kali Hardy — The Rookie/Lil' Sis (Randy's little sister)
- Kevin Betzer — Tech Specialist
- Keith Ramsey — The Rocker

== Episodes ==
No.	Title	Locations	Original release date	U.S. viewers (millions)
1	"I Fear That Train a Comin'"	Long Leaf Sawmill, Southern Forest Heritage Museum, Long Leaf, Louisiana; Old Train Depot, Lecompte, Louisiana	April 10, 2013	1.00
In the premiere, the Deep South Paranormal team investigates an abandoned sawmill where many workers died on the job from the wood chipper machine, furnace and a massive machine called the "Skidder". Today people say they've seen "their souls" wandering around the place. The team also splits up and stops at an old train depot on the grounds where the mangled worker's bodies were taken, and is now reportedly haunted by its former passengers.
2	"Till Death Do Us Part"	Mont Helena (plantation house), Rolling Fork, Mississippi; Henry Vick House, Vick Family House and Wharf House, Nitta Yuma, Mississippi	April 17, 2013	0.82
The Deep South Paranormal team heads to the Mississippi Delta to investigate a reportedly haunted plantation house that is currently used by a group of amateur actors to rehearse plays. There's an abandoned church located on property as well where it's said that the ghost of Helen weeps for her lover Henry. Their investigation also leads them five miles north of the plantation to the old town of Nitta Yuma where Henry and his family were from.
3	"Got Them Lady in Black Blues"	Prat Cotton Grin Factory, Prattville, Alabama	April 24, 2013	0.84
The Deep South Paranormal team travel to Alabama to investigate the 450,000 square-foot building of an abandoned cotton mill where many of its workers including children died while working heavy machinery in the early 19th century. Today, developers want to demolish the building to make condos. But before they do so, people have reported seeing a little boy who fell down an elevator shaft and a lady in black believed to be the boy's mother still mourning over the death of her son.
4	"Old Soldiers Never Die"	Palmer House (private residence), Macclenny, Florida; Olustee Battlefield Historic State Park, Olustee, Florida	May 1, 2013	0.71
The Deep South Paranormal team travel Florida to investigate a private residence which was once the site of a Civil War battle where many Union and Confederate soldiers had died while fighting. The family say they have experienced full-bodied apparitions and attacks while sleeping in middle of the night. In an attempt to stir up paranormal activity, they also participate in a reenactment on the Olustee Battlefield located near the house where Union troops retreated across the property during the Battle of Olustee.
5	"The Good, the Bad and the Ghostly"	Cahawba Cemetery & Bell Plantation, Cahawba, Alabama; St. James Hotel, Selma, Alabama	May 8, 2013	0.58
The Deep South Paranormal team travel Alabama to investigate the ghost town of Cahawba where a local family, the Bells were murdered in cold blood at their plantation while defending their slave servant Pleas who was accused of stealing by another family, the Troys. Today, both rival families vengeful spirits are said to wander around town scaring off the locals. With water levels from the Alabama River raising daily, they have to investigate quickly, including the cemetery, slave quarters and old plantation where the shoot-out occurred. They also pay a visit to the reportedly haunted St. James Hotel in Selma where Pleas was killed.
6	"Dead on the Bayou"	Southdown Plantation and Houma Burial Grounds (Bayou Sally Road), Houma, Louisiana	May 15, 2013	0.75
The Deep South Paranormal team travel Louisiana to investigate an old plantation house in the bayou where the Minor family mistreated their 233 slaves to the point of murdering them. The main house is said to be haunted by the ghost of a little girl believed to be Anna, one of the granddaughters of the builder of the house who died of yellow fever in the home. They then head to Bayou Sally Road nearby to follow up on reports of people seeing the ghosts of the Houma Native American tribe who were exiled from the land and left for dead here.

== See also ==
- List of reportedly haunted locations in the United States
- List of reportedly haunted locations in the world
