= Behind the Scenes (Canadian TV series) =

Canadian television series

- Country of origin: Canada

Original release
- Network: Space
- Release: 1997

Behind the Scenes is a Canadian television series on the Space network that debuted in 1997. It features behind-the-scenes looks at various television series and mini-series on Space, and interviews with their casts and crews.

== Featured shows ==
- Alienated
- Battlestar Galactica (TV miniseries)
- Battlestar Galactica (2004 TV series)
- Charlie Jade
- The Collector
- The Dead Zone
- Star Trek: Enterprise
- First Wave
- Relic Hunter
- Smallville
- Stargate SG-1
- Starhunter
- Supernatural
- Tracker
