= The Antiques Ghost Show =

- Starring: Derek Acorah; Christopher Gower
- Country of origin: United Kingdom
- No. of episodes: unknown

Production
- Running time: 30 minutes

Original release
- Network: Living TV
- Release: 2003 – present

The Antiques Ghost Show was a 'reality' show commissioned in 2003 by Living TV. Members of the public would bring self-proclaimed psychic Derek Acorah their antiques. After Acorah has made claims about the history of the item, using a method he calls psychometry, Christopher Gower and a genealogist are given 48 hours to verify the assertions. When analysing the history of an antique, Acorah will often act out events he believes has happened.

The show was sold to Bravo! in Canada and other networks in Australia, where in terms of ratings, it was immensely popular. In terms of critical reception, it was met extremely poorly, with critics noting that just as much could be learnt about the history of the antiques without Acorah's readings.
