= Behind the Scenes (band) =

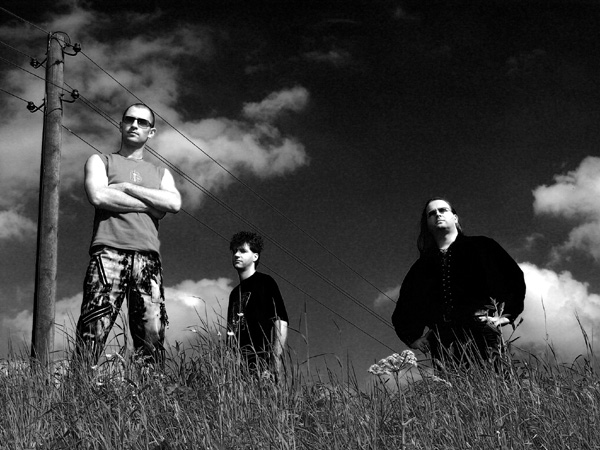

Background information
- Origin: Germany
- Genres: Gothic rock
- Years active: 1993–present
- Labels: Indy
- Members: Mel (vocals); Scholli (guitar); Fred B (bass guitar)
- Website: http://www.behindthescenes.de/

Behind The Scenes are a gothic rock band from Germany.

== See also ==
- The Sisters of Mercy
- The Mission UK
