= Conjuring Kesha =

- Genre: Paranormal, reality television
- Starring: Kesha
- Country of origin: United States
- Original language: English
- No. of seasons: 1
- No. of episodes: 6

Production
- Executive producers: Kesha Sebert; Dan Newmark; Ben Newmark; Jack Rovner; Lagan Sebert; Elaine White; French Horwitz
- Running time: 60 minutes
- Production companies: Grandma's House Entertainment; Magic Seed Productions

Original release
- Network: Discovery+
- Release: July 8 – August 5, 2022

Conjuring Kesha is an American paranormal reality television series about singer-songwriter Kesha and her experiences exploring mysterious paranormal hotspots. It aired on Discovery+ from July 8, 2022 to August 5, 2022. The show is an extension of Kesha's podcast Kesha and the Creepies.

== Premise ==
The show features Kesha and her adventures going ghost-hunting and exploring paranormal hotspots. In each episode, she invites other celebrities such as actress and comedian Whitney Cummings, rapper Big Freedia, and singer Betty Who.

== Cast ==
=== Main cast ===
- Kesha Sebert

=== Guests ===
- Whitney Cummings
- Betty Who
- GaTa
- JoJo Fletcher
- Karen Elson
- Big Freedia

== Episodes ==
=== Series overview ===
Season	Episodes	Originally released	
Season	Episodes	First released	Last released
1	6	July 8, 2022	August 5, 2022

=== Season 1 (2022) ===
No. overall	No. in season	Title	Original release date
1	1	"Not Today, Satan"	July 8, 2022
Kesha is pushed to her limit when she and comedian Whitney Cummings make contact with demonic force at a maximum-security penitentiary in Tennessee.
2	2	"Songs For The Dead"	July 8, 2022
Kesha and Betty Who unravel the mysteries of Antoinette Hall, one of America's oldest and most haunted opera houses. The deeper they delve into the dark secrets beneath the old stage, the more aggressive the spirits become with Kesha and her crew.
3	3	"A Terrifying True"	July 15, 2022
Kesha and GaTa check in for a night of terror at the Westerfeld House. Is master illusionist Harry Houdini responsible for the electrifying paranormal activity? Or is it the satanic rituals and an unsolved murder? They must listen to uncover the truth.
4	4	"Into Bigfoot's Lair"	July 22, 2022
Kesha takes JoJo Fletcher to Mount Shasta, a supernatural vortex with the most missing person cases of any national park in the US. They enlist Bigfoot expert Ronny LeBlanc to lead them through the dark abyss in hopes of spotting the mythical beast.
5	5	"Kesha Faces Immortality"	July 29, 2022
Kesha is joined by model Karen Elson as they peel back the curtain on infamous secret society Odd Fellows.
6	6	"Descent Into Madness"	August 5, 2022
Kesha and rapper Big Freedia face their worst fears at Trans-Allegheny Lunatic Asylum. The building comes to life overnight, spurring violent activity and revealing disturbing truths. Psychic Chip Coffey joins them in hopes of setting the spirits free.

== Reception ==
Conjuring Kesha received positive reviews from critics. Stuart Heritage of The Guardian and Kelly McClure of Salon gave it positive reviews, stating how fun and bizarre the show is. Coleman Spilde of The Daily Beast called the show "charming in its silliness" and "the most fun I’ve had with television all year".
