= Shadow Hunter (TV series) =

- Genre: Documentary
- Presented by: Darryll Walsh
- Country of origin: Canada
- Original language: English
- No. of series: 1
- No. of episodes: 13

Production
- Production company: CHUM Television

Original release
- Network: Space
- Release: December 8, 2005 – March 2, 2006

Shadow Hunter is a 13-episode documentary television series about the paranormal, hosted by Darryll Walsh, a ghost hunter, best-selling author, and doctor of parapsychology.

"Cases" presented in the series are from Walsh's own collection, news headlines, the internet, and parapsychological organizations that Walsh speaks to.

The series is produced in association with CHUM Television, and aired on Space in Canada.

== Episodes ==
Main source: The Movie DB Website

Season 1 (2005)
No. in season	Title	Original air date
1	"The Mortal Cup"	December 8, 2005
2	"The Descent Into Hell Isn't Easy"	December 15, 2005
3	"Dead Man's Party"	December 22, 2005
4	"Raising Hell"	December 29, 2005
5	"Moo Shu to Go"	January 5, 2006
6	"Of Men and Angels"	January 12, 2006
7	"Major Arcana"	January 19, 2006
8	"Bad Blood"	January 26, 2006
9	"Rise Up"	February 2, 2006
10	"This World Inverted"	February 9, 2006
13	"Blood Calls to Blood"	February 16, 2006
14	"Malec"	February 23, 2006
15	"Morning Star"	March 2, 2006
