= Killer Contact =

2013 American TV paranormal series

- Also known as: Notorious Hauntings
- Genre: Paranormal
- Narrated by: Darren O'Hare
- Composer: Vanacore Music Group
- Country of origin: United States
- Original language: English
- No. of seasons: 1
- No. of episodes: 6

Production
- Executive producers: Craig Piligian; Mike Nichols
- Cinematography: Alex Pappas
- Editors: Kelly Brunerk-Kirkpatrick; Kevin Hibbard; Carl DeGrazio
- Running time: 42 minutes
- Production company: Pilgram Studios

Original release
- Network: Syfy
- Release: December 4 – December 18, 2013

Killer Contact (previously titled Notorious Hauntings) is an American paranormal television series on Syfy that premiered on December 4, 2013 at 10pm EST. The series features a group of paranormal researchers who investigate reported paranormal activity in haunted locations around the world including the notorious characteres these locations are associated with through history.

== Format ==
A paranormal team travels to the world's most haunted locations where infamous crimes were committed. They try to solve these cold cases by the only method they know; gathering evidence with the help of the supernatural using their technical ghost hunting equipment, antagonization and roleplaying scenarios to communicate with them. This show is based on real historical events.

Opening Introduction (narrated by Darren O'Hare):

There's a new breed of investigator whose mission is to solve the world's most enduring crimes and mysteries. But what sets this paranormal team apart is...they use the paranormal to solve these crimes. When activity breaks out at these notorious locations, this rapid response team moves in...using unconventional methods to get the spirits' attention...roleplaying to antagonizing. They stop at nothing to get answers...from the dead.

== Cast ==
- Austin Cook - The Point Man
- Greg Niecestro - The Antagonizer
- Hector Barragan - The Tech Guru
- Adam Leidenfrost - The Brain
- Molly O'Connolly - The Role Player

== Episodes ==
| No. | Title | Original release date |
|---|---|---|
| 1 | "Jack the Ripper" | December 4, 2013 |
In the series premiere, the Killer Contact paranormal team travels to London, England to investigate the reported hauntings of Jack the Ripper by following his notorious path to the famous sites in Whitechapel where his heinous crimes took place. First they follow his path to The Ten Bells pub where three of the five prostitutes (Annie Chapman, Catherine Eddowes and Mary Jane Kelly) he murdered worked. Then their evidence of a man the ladies called "Leather Apron" leads them to The Princess Alice pub where Jack frequented.
| 2 | "Vlad the Impaler: Dracula" | December 10, 2013 |
The Killer Contact team follow in the footsteps of the most infamous vampire, Vlad Tepes a.k.a. Vlad the Impaler better known as Dracula while traveling through the countryside in Transylvania. They try to find out the truth behind the legend of this sadistic ruler who supposedly drank the blood of his enemies hoping to become immortal and later was imprisoned at Hunedoara Castle for his crimes where the team gathers evidence during their investigation.
| 3 | "Lucrezia Borgia" | December 11, 2013 |
The team travels to Ferrara, Italy to investigate Castello Estense to uncover the mystery of Lucrezia Borgia, daughter of Pope Rodrigo Borgia and head of the world's first organized crime family and most feared family during the 16th century. Locals believe she is one of the most manipulative and evil women in Italian history. Lucrezia herself went down in history as a femme fatale because of the rumors that she used her beauty and sexual allure to bring men to her castle and poison them using arsenic.
| 4 | "The Hellfire Club" | December 17, 2013 |
The team researches the paranormal activity surrounding the notorious Hell Fire Club, an historic secret society for United Kingdom's elite. First they travel to Edinburgh, Scotland to Glimerton Cove, one of the club's locations to gather evidence in the cave-like corridors believed to have been a storage for the club's victims. Then they head to the club's headquarters, an old hunting lodge on Montpelier Hill in Dublin, Ireland to find out if a centuries old vow of silence covered up the club's murders, orgies and rituals of human sacrifice.
| 5 | "The Mayan Empire" | December 18, 2013 |
The team searches St. Herman's Cave deep in the dense jungles of Belmopan, Belize to investigate a series of hauntings tied to the ruthless and cruel Mayan 7th century ruler Lord Smoking Shell who some believe destroyed his empire in a quest for personal glory by sacrificing of children. This spiked the paranormal events at the cave and may also be connected to the Mayan calendar which may have something to do with the end of the world. They continue their investigation at the Lamanai Ruins where the lord liked to play mesoamerican, a popular ball game.
| 6 | "The Butcher of Iquique" | December 18, 2013 |
