= CTV Sci-Fi Channel =

Canadian specialty TV channel

Coordinates: 43.649701°N 79.390233°W

- Country: Canada
- Broadcast area: National
- Headquarters: 299 Queen Street West, Toronto, Ontario, Canada

Programming
- Picture format: 1080i HDTV

Ownership
- Owner: BCE Inc.
- Parent: Bell Media
- Sister channels: CTV; CTV 2 CTV Comedy Channel; CTV Drama Channel; CTV Life Channel; CTV News Channel; CTV Nature Channel; CTV Speed Channel; CTV Wild Channel

History
- Launched: October 17, 1997; 29 years ago
- Former names: Space (1997–2019)

Links
- Website: www.ctv.ca/sci-fi

CTV Sci-Fi Channel is a Canadian English-language discretionary specialty channel owned by Bell Media subsidairy of BCE Inc. The channel primarily broadcasts speculative fiction and related programming.

The network was launched on October 17, 1997 as Space, under its original parent company CHUM Limited. Its slogan, "The Imagination Station", continued to be used informally by its fans for many years after its retirement. In 2007, Space was acquired by CTVglobemedia, after acquiring CHUM Limited, while the Citytv stations were sold to Rogers Media. The channel adopted its current name in 2019.

== History ==
Logo for Space, used from 2013 to 2019

The channel was licensed by the Canadian Radio-television and Telecommunications Commission (CRTC) in 1996. It launched on October 17, 1997 at 6:00 p.m. ET (3:00 p.m. PT), as Space: The Imagination Station, launching under the ownership of CHUM Limited, airing the film Forbidden Planet, followed by a commentary on that film by author Robert J. Sawyer, followed by the film Mars Attacks!. The Sawyer commentary was the first example of the interstitial materials — mostly produced by Mark Askwith — that became SPACE's signature: short, snappy, mini-documentaries on science fiction and science topics shown between programs, collectively known as "SPACE Flow". Daily installments include Space News (formerly SPIN, for "Space Information and News").

CTVglobemedia took over Space on June 22, 2007, as a result of a takeover of CHUM Limited. At the same time, the Citytv stations were sold to Rogers later that year. Ownership changed hands once again when on April 1, 2011, BCE Inc. gained 100% control of CTVglobemedia's non-publishing assets that it did not already own, placing Space under the ownership of Bell Media.

On February 8, 2011, the Reeves-Stevenses submitted a letter to the Canadian Radio-television and Telecommunications Commission (CRTC) in support of an application by CTVglobemedia to renew the broadcasting license of Space.

On July 6, 2011, a high definition simulcast of Space was launched.

On March 4, 2013, Space introduced a new logo and slogan ("It's all around you") to coincide with the premiere of its original co-production Orphan Black. The rebrand notably moved from a outer space theme to scenes of the new logo formed by real-life objects with a "phenomenal twist", symbolizing a broadening of the science fiction genre (and, in turn, the channel's programming) beyond space operas.

On June 7, 2018, it was announced that Space would be rebranded as "CTV Sci-Fi", as part of a re-alignment of several Bell Media specialty channels under the CTV brand. The following year, it was revealed the channel would instead rebrand as CTV Sci-Fi Channel on September 12, 2019.

== Programming ==
CTV Sci-Fi Channel's programming includes scripted television series and films primarily focused on the science fiction, fantasy, superhero fiction, horror, and paranormal genres, often in a marathon format outside of prime time. The channel's original programming has included in-studio shows (including the daily newsmagazine Innerspace), scripted dramas, as well as shows co-produced with the American channel Syfy, from which the channel also acquires the bulk of its programming.

The channel holds the linear television rights to the Star Trek television franchise in Canada, holding library rights to past Star Trek television seasons and movies, and having acquired the rights to the newer Star Trek era, beginning with Star Trek: Discovery, that are produced for the Paramount+ streaming service.

=== Current programming ===
==== Acquired ====
- The Ark
- Dark Winds
- Interview with the Vampire
- The Librarians: The Next Chapter
- Mayfair Witches
- Sanctuary: A Witch's Tale
- Star Trek: Starfleet Academy
- Star Trek: Strange New Worlds

=== Former programming ===
==== Original ====
- Aftermath
- Astrid & Lilly Save the World
- Behind the Scenes
- Being Human
- Bitten
- Charlie Jade
- The Conspiracy Guy
- Dark Matter
- Fanboy Confessional
- First Wave
- The Girly Ghosthunters
- Grand Star
- HypaSpace
- Innerspace
- Killjoys
- Orphan Black
- Paranormal Revenge
- Primeval: New World
- Rabbit Fall
- Revival
- Sanctuary
- Shadow Hunter
- Shelf Space
- Space Interstitials
- Space Top 10 Countdown
- The SpaceBar
- SpaceNews
- Steve Smith Playhouse
- Stormworld
- SurrealEstate
- Todd & The Book of Pure Evil
- Tripping the Rift
- Unexplained Canada
- Wynonna Earp

==== Acquired ====
- The 4400
- Andromeda
- Arrow
- Babylon 5
- Battlestar Galactica
- Being Human
- Beyond
- Blood Ties
- Buffy the Vampire Slayer
- Captain Star
- Cosplay Melee
- Dark Angel
- Dark Matters: Twisted But True
- Day of the Dead
- Dead Set
- Deadly Class
- The Deep
- Defying Gravity
- Doctor Who
- Do No Harm
- Doom Patrol
- The Dresden Files
- Enigma
- The Expanse
- Face Off
- Farscape
- Firefly
- The Following
- Ghost Mine
- Grimm
- Hex
- Hilarious House of Frightenstein
- Krypton
- Legends of Tomorrow
- Lost
- Lost in Space
- The Lost Room
- Manimal
- Medium
- Merlin
- Mutant X
- Night Stalker
- The Outer Limits
- Pandora
- Paranormal Witness
- Perversions of Science
- Primeval
- Prisoners of Gravity
- Quantum Leap
- Raised by Wolves
- Reginald the Vampire
- Relic Hunter
- Resident Alien
- Ripper Street
- Roar
- Robot Combat League
- Robotech
- The Secret Adventures of Jules Verne
- The Sentinel
- Smallville
- Snowpiercer
- Space Precinct
- Stan Against Evil
- Stargate Atlantis
- Stargate SG-1
- Stargate Universe
- Star Trek
- Star Trek: Deep Space Nine
- Star Trek: Discovery
- Star Trek: Enterprise
- Star Trek: Lower Decks
- Star Trek: The Next Generation
- Star Trek: Picard
- Star Trek: Prodigy
- Star Trek: Voyager
- Superman & Lois
- Supernatural
- Surface
- Terminator: The Sarah Connor Chronicles
- Threshold
- Total Blackout
- Total Recall 2070
- The Triangle
- True Blood
- The Twilight Zone
- Urban Legend
- Utopia
- Voyage to the Bottom of the Sea
- War of the Worlds
- Xena: Warrior Princess
- The X-Files
- Z Nation

=== Former annual events ===
- The Spacey Awards: Space previously presented its own awards called the Spacey Awards to the best in sci-fi, fantasy and horror films, TV shows, and video games. Some of the awards are voted on by viewers and the others by Space.
- Santa Claus Conquers the Martians: Aired for many years in December 25.
- The Twelve Days of Space-mas: Twelve days of marathons, either of popular Space programs or of similarly-themed, sci-fi or fantasy films. This normally includes the Doctor Who Christmas special on Christmas Day.
