= I Was Possessed =

- Genre: Reality
- Country of origin: United States
- Original language: English

Production
- Production company: Sirens Media

Original release
- Network: LMN
- Release: July 11, 2015

I Was Possessed is an American reality television series based on true life accounts of possession, premiered on July 11, 2015, in the United States, on LMN.

== Episodes ==
No.	Title	Original release date
1	"Molly; Tanisha"	July 11, 2015
People who were victims of demonic possession tell their stories. In the opener, a woman recalls praying to demonic entities to take her instead of her son who was talking to people she couldn't see; and another woman speaks about generational demons that surfaced when she was pulled away from a safe environment and thrust into a world she didn't like.
2	"Aicha; Caleb"	July 18, 2015
A woman discusses moving into a house haunted by a dark entity; a man explains how he was tormented by an evil presence since childhood.
3	"Hannah; Carole"	July 25, 2015
A woman's attempt to start over begins a downward spiral; a new relationship ends in unexpected terror for a woman.
4	"Jessica; Adam"	August 1, 2015
A woman describes being demoniacally possessed as a girl when her grandparents dabbled in the occult; a man discusses being overtaken by a demon who was intent on burning down his house.
5	"Travis; Melissa"	August 8, 2015
A man describes being demon possessed after moving into a new home that was trashed with satanic objects; a woman discusses being surrounded by a dark presence that grows stronger after she moves in with her boyfriend.
6	"Rose; Minda"	August 15, 2015
A woman becomes possessed when she wakes up from a three-month coma and hears a man dying across the hall. Also: a woman's dream life comes crashing down.
