= Is It Real? =

American television series (2005–2007)

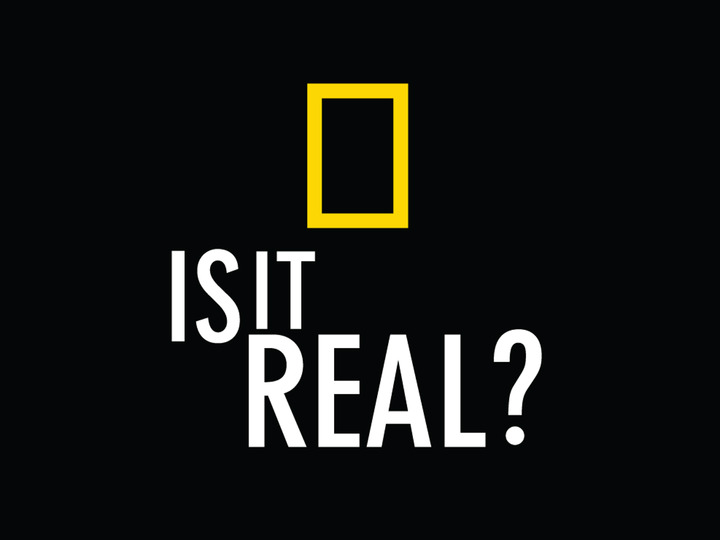
- Genre: Paranormal; Mystery
- Narrated by: Ian Gregory
- Country of origin: United States
- Original language: English
- No. of episodes: 29

Production
- Executive producer: Eleanor Grant
- Producer: French Horwitz (series producer)
- Camera setup: Multiple
- Running time: 45-47 minutes
- Production company: National Geographic Society

Original release
- Network: National Geographic Channel
- Release: April 25, 2005 – October 15, 2007

Is It Real? is an American television series that aired on the National Geographic Channel from April 25, 2005, to October 15, 2007. The program examines popular or persistent mysteries to determine whether the featured cryptid or supernatural phenomenon is real or not. The show typically includes interviews with believers or proponents of the featured paranormal claims, and then with scientists and skeptics who attempt to find rational explanations for such phenomena using a scientific approach.

The show is currently available for streaming on Amazon Prime.

== Reception ==
On June 23, 2008, Is It Real? was presented an award at the 2nd annual IIG awards.

== Episodes ==
No.	Title	Original release date
1	"Spontaneous Human Combustion"	April 25, 2005
2	"UFOs"	April 25, 2005
3	"Ghosts"	April 25, 2005
4	"Bigfoot"	June 23, 2005
5	"Monsters of the Deep"	August 1, 2005
6	"Psychic Animals"	August 14, 2005
7	"Superhuman Powers"	August 20, 2005
8	"Exorcism"	August 29, 2005
9	"Crop Circles"	September 1, 2005
10	"Police Psychics"	September 12, 2005
11	"Chupacabra"	November 4, 2005
12	"Extreme Sleepwalking"	November 21, 2005
13	"Stigmata"	January 4, 2006
14	"Ape-Man"	February 27, 2006
15	"Nostradamus Effect"	April 17, 2006
16	"Davinci's Code"	April 24, 2006
17	"Bermuda Triangle"	September 25, 2006
18	"Atlantis"	October 2, 2006
19	"Miracle Cures"	October 9, 2006
20	"Vampires"	October 23, 2006
21	"Jack the Ripper"	October 30, 2006
22	"Hauntings"	November 13, 2006
23	"Russian Bigfoot"	November 20, 2006
24	"Ancient Astronauts"	November 27, 2006
25	"Life on Mars"	January 24, 2007
26	"Feral Children"	April 17, 2007
27	"King Arthur"	May 7, 2007
28	"Secrets of the Shroud"	July 23, 2007
29	"Ghost Ships"	October 15, 2007

== See also ==
- Cryptid
- Cryptozoology
