= School Spirits (2012 TV series) =

American TV series

- Genre: Paranormal; Documentary
- Written by: Mora Stephens
- Country of origin: United States
- Original language: English
- No. of seasons: 1
- No. of episodes: 6

Production
- Executive producers: Mark Burnett; Seth Jarrett; Julie Insogna-Jarrett
- Producers: Andrea DeBrito; Sandy Green (sup.)
- Production location: United States
- Cinematography: Paul Marshall (lead); Joel Vietel; Christopher K. Dillon
- Editor: Timothy Dixon
- Running time: 45 minutes
- Production companies: Realand Productions; Jarrett Creative

Original release
- Network: Syfy
- Release: June 22 – August 1, 2012

School Spirits is an American paranormal documentary television series which aired on the Syfy channel. The series premiered on June 20, 2012, and aired through August 1, 2012. The series features alleged paranormal encounters told through reenactments that are based on occurrences at schools and universities in America.

== Summary ==
The series focuses on purported paranormal experiences told by students and professors at their respective schools and universities. Each episode begins with the introduction:

What you are about to witness...is based on actual accounts...from students at [enter school]...who experienced paranormal events.

Tagline:

Every campus has its secrets...School Spirits.

Promo intro:

They may have survived their first day. But their next lesson...will be deadly.

== Episodes ==
| No. | Title | Location(s) | Original release date |
|---|---|---|---|
| 1 | "Sorority House Terror" | "Gamma Alpha Gamma" Sorority House, University of Michigan, Ann Arbor, Michigan | June 20, 2012 |
In the series premiere, ghost stories from the University of Michigan sorority house that took place in 2007 are featured. Sorority sisters who lived in a former fraternity house claim they saw the ghost of a man named Joseph Jacob Walser, a graduate of the university who once lived in the house with his family in the late 1890s. The sisters are frightened and say they feel a negative energy in the house that they believe was warded off by Walser, who had died of tuberculosis and is believed by the sisters to have returned to protect them. "Gamma Alpha Gamma" is actually the local women's organization Phi Rho Alpha Sorority.
| 2 | "Dorm Room Nightmare" | State University of New York at Geneseo, Geneseo, New York | June 27, 2012 |
A former student claims to have seen a ghost who had broken his neck from hanging himself in the same dorm room the student was staying in years ago in Residence Hall C at State University of New York at Geneseo (SUNY Geneseo) in 1985. The student believes the ghost had been asking for help and disappeared after he carried out a small ritual.
| 3 | "Collision Course/Deadly Dorm Games" | "SHS" (high school), Saline, Michigan; Lebanon Valley College, Annville, Pennsylvania | July 11, 2012 |
A woman claims to be haunted by the ghost of a young man in a leather bomber jacket from the local Catholic high school who was killed in a car crash in the mid-1980s. College roommate pranksters in Mary Green Hall at Lebanon Valley College in 2002 claim to see the ghost of a little girl who was hit by a train in the 1950s.
| 4 | "Ghostly Girls' School" | Sweet Briar College, Sweet Briar, Virginia | July 18, 2012 |
In 2007, four friends of Sweet Briar College for women claim to see a ghost of a deceased girl believed to be the school founder’s (Indiana Fletcher Williams) daughter Daisy in their dormitory and at her old plantation house site where she died of antitrypsin deficiency at a young age. The shadowy figure of a tall man thought to be Lucien Fletcher, Indiana's brother and Daisy's uncle is said to terrorize students on campus because he is still angry that the family's inheritance went to an all-girls school instead of to him. The friends believe Daisy's spirit helps keep Fletcher's angry ghost away.
| 5 | "Campus Warning Signs" | Eastern Kentucky University, Richmond, Kentucky | July 25, 2012 |
Becca, a conservative student at EKU (Eastern Kentucky University) claims to see a man with no eyes in a crowded hallway, a shadow figure in her dorm room and the ghost of a deceased Victorian lady during her freshman year in 2007. Her friend Stephanie gives her advice regarding the supernatural. They claim to see a black mass forming on the ceiling of the room, a little demon girl who harasses them, and a bloody woman who was murdered near the campus in the winter of 2011.
| 6 | "Frat House Phantom" | Sigma Alpha Phi Fraternity House, Slippery Rock University, Slippery Rock, Pennsylvania | August 1, 2012 |
In the season finale, frat brothers at a fraternity house at Slippery Rock University claim to have used a Ouija board to contact spirits of people involved in the Wigton massacre of 1843.

== See also ==
- Ghost hunting
- List of reportedly haunted locations in the world
- List of reportedly haunted locations in the United States
- Paranormal television
