= Unexplained Canada =

Canadian television series

Unexplained Canada is a show that aired on Space, a Canadian cable television station. It was a six-part series coming from many different perspectives of historical/social mysteries. It was hosted by John Robert Colombo and premiered January 2006. The show was produced by KarowPrime Films in Canada.
