= Enigma (Canadian TV series) =

- Genre: Documentary
- Country of origin: Canada
- Original language: English

Production
- Executive producers: Donna Zuckerbrot; Daniel Zuckerbrot; Alberta Nokes
- Running time: 47 minutes

Original release
- Network: VisionTV

Enigma is a Canadian documentary TV series about enigmas throughout history developed by Reel Time Images and VisionTV Reel Time Images. Each episode is 47 minutes and focuses on a riddle, a puzzle, or mystery, which the documentary sets out to solve or illuminate.

== Episodes ==
(in alphabetical order)

1. Aleister Crowley: The Beast 666
2. Conjuring Philip
3. Hypnotized!: The Trance State
4. Jack Parsons: Jet Propelled Antichrist
5. Madame Blavatsky: Spiritual Traveller
6. Max Maven: A Fabulous Monster
7. Silo: Sage of The Andes
8. Spiritualism:The Fox Sisters
9. Tarot
10. The Houdini Code
11. Zombies: When the Dead Walk
