= Jeremy Warmsley =

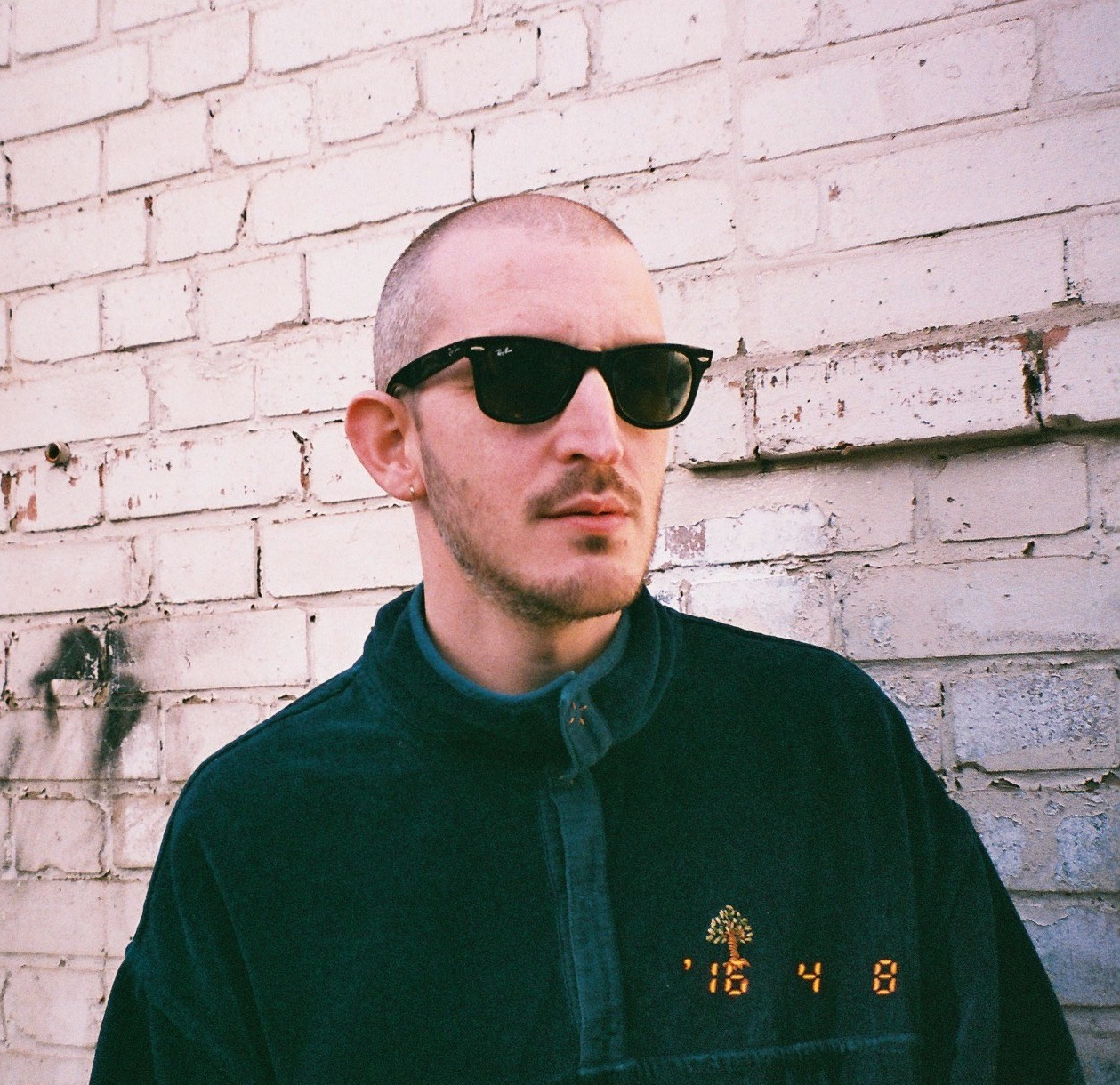
- Jeremy Warmsley in 2024

Background information
- Origin: London, England
- Genres: Film score, Indie, folktronica
- Years active: 2005–present
- Label: Transgressive Records
- Member of: Summer Camp

Jeremy Warmsley is a London-based musician, composer and film producer.

== Biography ==
From 2005 to 2009, he worked as a solo artist, recording two albums for Transgressive Records and touring with Regina Spektor and The Shins. Since 2009 he has worked with his wife Elizabeth Sankey as Summer Camp, releasing three albums on the Moshi Moshi label.

In 2014, he composed his first soundtrack, with Summer Camp, for Charlie Lyne's Beyond Clueless. Since then he has gone on to score several more of Charlie Lyne's films as well as Simon Amstell's mockumentary Carnage.

In 2016/17 he wrote the tracks to the game Jalopy made by Greg MinksWorks, as well as the game Landlord's Super made by Minskworks in 2020.

On 18 September 2018, he released a new song, "Moment", which was commissioned for the BBC/Netflix drama series, Wanderlust.

In 2019, he began his 'A Year' project, releasing a series of singles, one per month. The first track, "January", was playlisted by BBC Radio 6 Music.

That year, he also produced the film Romantic Comedy and in 2024, the award-winning Witches, both directed by Elizabeth Sankey.

== Filmography ==
- 2014: Beyond Clueless (with Summer Camp)
- 2015: Fear Itself
- 2017: Carnage
- 2017: Fish Story
- 2017: Personal Truth
- 2018: Right Place, Wrong Tim
- 2018: The Adventures of Rocky and Bullwinkle (TV show, "Dark Side of the Moose" theme only)
- 2019: Romantic Comedy
- 2021: The Afterlight
- 2023: The Power of Parker (TV show)
- 2024: Big Mood (TV show)
- 2024: Witches
- 2026: Lady Grace Mysteries (TV show)

== Discography ==
=== Singles and EPs ===
- "I Believe In The Way You Move" – 4 July 2005, EXERCISE1 Records (200 run Limited Edition single)
- "5 Interesting Lies" – 7 November 2005, Transgressive Records (500 run EP)
- "Other People's Secrets" – 10 April 2006, Transgressive Records (500 run EP)
- "I Promise" – 10 July 2006, Transgressive Records
- "I Believe In The Way You Move (rerecording)" – 25 September 2006, Transgressive Records
- "Dirty Blue Jeans" – 18 December 2006, Transgressive Records (500 run single)
- "The Boat Song/Temptation" – April 2008, Transgressive Records (500 run single)
- "Lose My Cool" – 11 August 2008, Transgressive Records (digital single)
- "Moment" – 18 September 2018, commissioned for BBC/Netflix drama Wanderlust.
- "January" – 7 January 2019, part of his 'A Year' project.

=== Albums ===
- The Art of Fiction – 9 October 2006, Transgressive Records
- How We Became – September 2008, Transgressive Records
