= Zodiac Killer Project =

2025 American documentary film

- US theatrical release poster
- Directed by: Charlie Shackleton
- Produced by: Charlie Shackleton; Anthony Ing; Catherine Bray
- Cinematography: Xenia Patricia
- Edited by: Charlie Shackleton
- Music by: Jeremy Warmsley
- Production companies: Loop; Field of Vision
- Distributed by: Music Box Films (United States); Loop Projects (United Kingdom)
- Release dates: January 27, 2025 (Sundance); November 21, 2025 (United States); November 28, 2025 (United Kingdom)
- Running time: 92 minutes
- Countries: United States; United Kingdom
- Language: English
- Box office: $22,777

Zodiac Killer Project is a 2025 documentary film, directed, produced, and edited by Charlie Shackleton.

It had its world premiere at the Sundance Film Festival on January 27, 2025, where it won the NEXT Innovator Award.

== Premise ==
It follows Shackleton's failed attempt to make a documentary revolving around the Zodiac Killer.

== Release ==
It had its world premiere at the Sundance Film Festival on January 27, 2025, where it won the NEXT Innovator Award. It also screened at True/False Film Festival on February 28, 2025, South by Southwest on March 8, 2025, and CPH:DOX on March 24, 2025, In April 2025, Music Box Films acquired the US distribution rights to the film. The film was released in New York City on November 21, which was then followed by San Francisco on November 28, and Chicago and Glendale on December 5, with more release dates to follow. The film was released independently in the United Kingdom on November 28.

It competed at Stockholm Documentary Competition of the 2025 Stockholm International Film Festival on November 5, 2025.

== Reception ==
On the review aggregator website Rotten Tomatoes, 90% of 69 critics' reviews are positive, with an average rating of 7/10. The website's consensus reads: "Director Charlie Shackleton rescues victory from the jaws of defeat in Zodiac Killer Project, a revelatory rumination on filmmaking and the overindulgences of the true crime genre." Metacritic, which uses a weighted average, assigned the film a score of 72 out of 100, based on 21 critics, indicating "generally favorable" reviews.

=== Accolades ===
The film received a nomination for Best Documentary Feature at the 9th Astra Film Awards.
