= Paint Drying =

2023 protest film by Charlie Shackleton

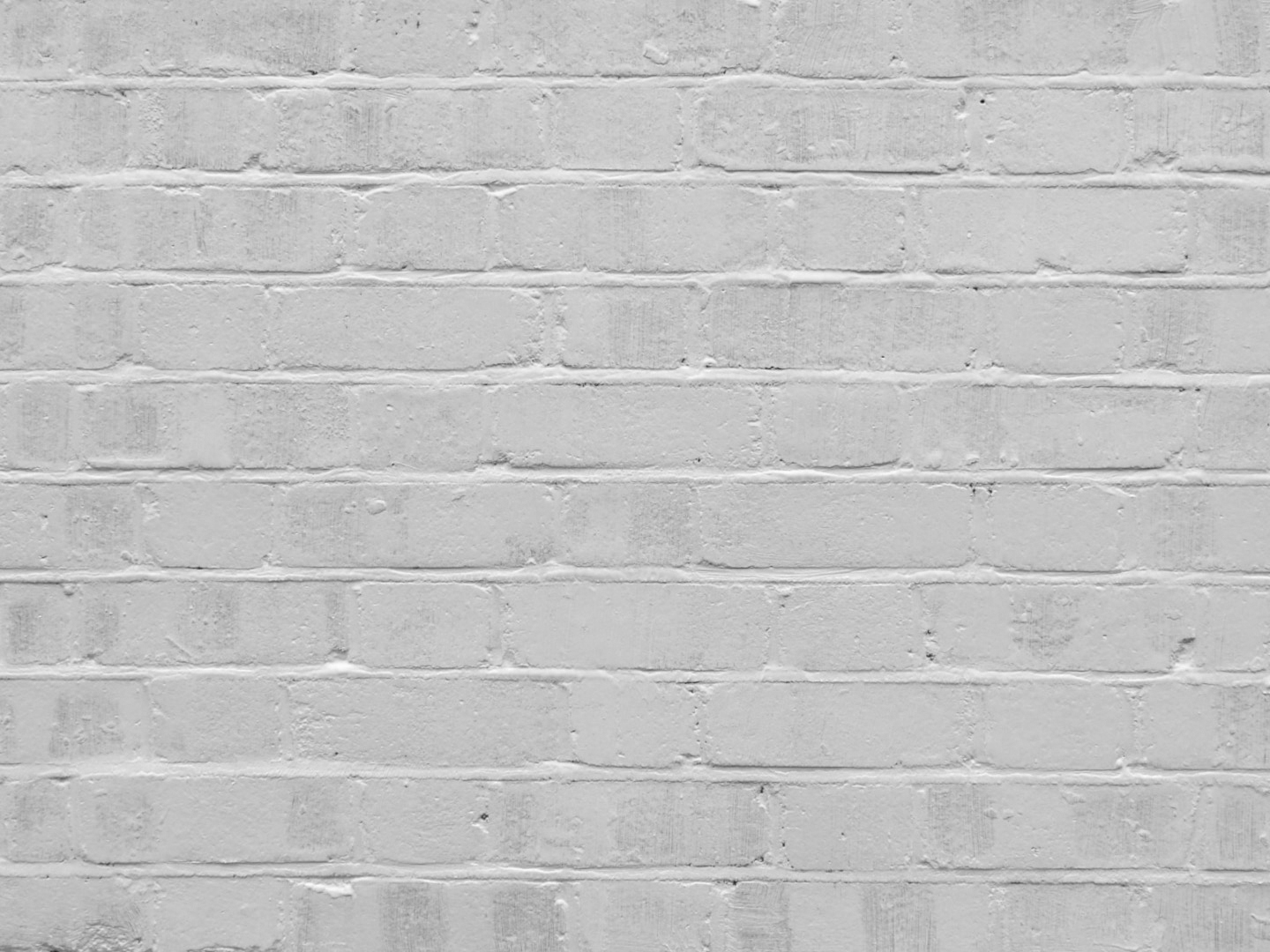
- Promotional still for the film
- Directed by: Charlie Shackleton
- Produced by: Charlie Shackleton
- Cinematography: Charlie Shackleton
- Edited by: Charlie Shackleton
- Release date: 10 November 2023 (QAGOMA)
- Running time: 607 minutes
- Country: United Kingdom
- Budget: £5,936 (Kickstarter)

Paint Drying is a 2023 (Note: Paint Drying was completed and submitted to the British Board of Film Classification in 2016, but not publicly released until 2023.) British experimental protest film that was produced, directed and shot by Charlie Shackleton. He created the film in 2016 to protest against film censorship in the United Kingdom and the sometimes prohibitive cost to independent filmmakers which the British Board of Film Classification's (BBFC) classification requirement imposes. The film consists of 607 minutes (10 hours and 7 minutes) of a static view of white paint drying on a brick wall.

Shackleton made the film to force the BBFC to watch all ten hours to give the film an age rating classification. He initially shot 14 hours' worth of footage of paint drying in 4K resolution and opened a Kickstarter campaign to pay the BBFC's per-minute rate for a film as long as possible. It raised £5,936 from 686 backers. After reviewing the film, the BBFC rated it 'U' for 'Universal', indicating "no material likely to offend or harm".

Paint Drying had its first public screening at the Queensland Art Gallery and Gallery of Modern Art in Brisbane, Australia, between 10–29 November 2023 as part of the Cinema Obstructed film exhibition—for which Shackleton was co-curator. As of February 2024, the film has not yet been released theatrically nor made publicly available online.

== Synopsis ==
A non-narrative film, Paint Drying consists of 607 minutes (10 hours and 7 minutes) of a static view of white paint drying on a brick wall. The entire film is a single continuous shot, and there is no audio. It receives its title from the expression "like watching paint dry", which refers to something very tedious or boring.

== Production ==
=== Background and conception ===
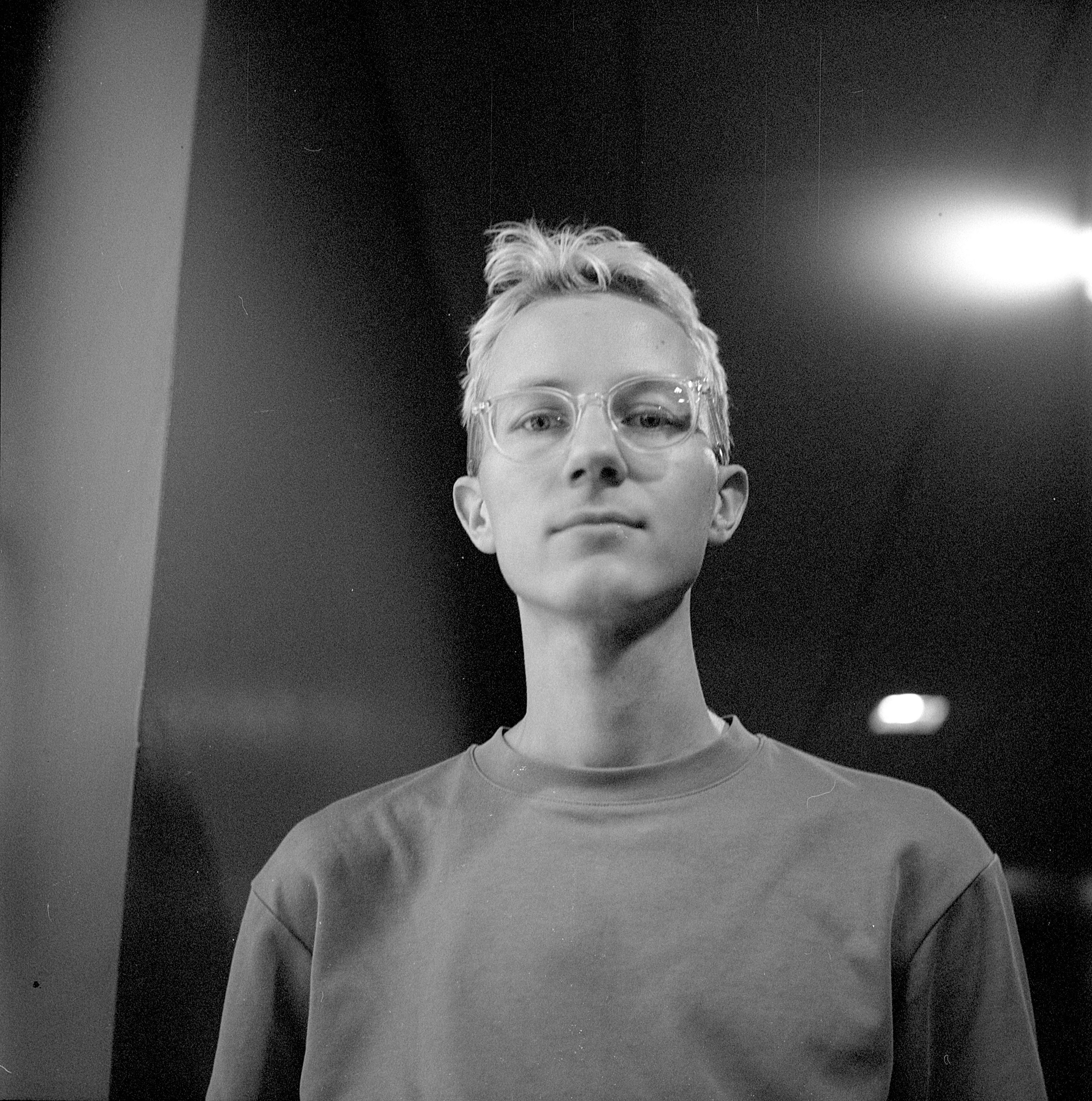
Shackleton in 2022

Charlie Shackleton (known as Charlie Lyne until 2019) is a British independent filmmaker. He has written, directed and produced several independent films, such as his essay-style documentary films Beyond Clueless (2014)—his directorial debut—and Fear Itself (2015). The British Board of Film Classification (BBFC) is the authority responsible for the national classification and censorship of films exhibited at cinemas and video works released on physical media within the United Kingdom. All filmmakers wishing to release a film in British cinemas are required to receive a rating from the BBFC or exemption from the local authority. In 2015, it cost £101.50 plus £7.09 per minute of runtime to have a film reviewed by the BBFC.

Paint Drying is a protest against both film censorship in the UK, and the unfair cost to independent filmmakers imposed by the BBFC's mandatory classification requirement. According to Shackleton, "this project [Paint Drying] is the culmination of a decade spent aimlessly railing against the BBFC—a decade that began when I was 13 years old". He states that his distaste for the BBFC began when he was reading the trivia section on IMDb for the 1999 American film Fight Club, and realised that the version he had seen was censored by the BBFC by having six seconds cut to "reduce the sense of sadistic pleasure in inflicting violence". Shackleton was dismayed, stating "if we censor art on the basis that someone somewhere might be hurt by it, we'll be left with no art at all. Should The White Album be banned because Charlie Manson used 'Helter Skelter' to justify murder?"

In protest against the BBFC's per-minute rate for film classifications, Shackleton stated that the average cost of an age classification for independent filmmakers could exceed £1,000, which would prove to be a heavy financial burden on most independent filmmakers. According to Shackleton, the BBFC certificate for his debut self-distributed film, Beyond Clueless, cost £867.60, which was roughly fifty per cent of its distribution budget. Shackleton stated that he knew of several planned cinematic releases from independent filmmakers that had to be abandoned because the cost was too high, which he added was "terrible for British film culture". He conceived the idea to make a film about paint drying while at a filmmaker's event at the BBFC in 2015. He had expected to see conflict between the BBFC examiners and the visiting filmmakers, but was surprised that there was no such disagreement; Shackleton added that, on the contrary, many of the attending filmmakers seemed to be supportive of the BBFC. He also disapproved of the examiners who were discussing the censorship of certain films and the rationale behind such action.

=== Filming, editing and Kickstarter campaign ===
Paint Drying was made to force the British Board of Film Classification (BBFC) to watch all ten hours in order to give the film an age rating classification.

Shackleton initially shot 14 hours' worth of footage of white paint drying in 4K resolution. He chose the colour white because of its "certain Tom Sawyer charm". The location of the wall that was painted was initially not disclosed. (Note: On 16 November 2025, Shackleton revealed the location as the outside of a flat in Archway, London.) On 16 November 2015, Shackleton opened a Kickstarter campaign to make the film's released length as long as possible. The funds raised would be put towards the cost of the age classification, the final length of the film being resolute with how much money was raised from the campaign.

It had raised £961—worth 2 hours and 1 minute of footage—by 18 November, and an individual unaffiliated with the campaign created a website that tracked in real time how long Paint Drying would be. By 20 November, the film had raised £3,147, which equated to more than seven hours of footage. By 23 November, Paint Drying hit £4,000. Shackleton stated that he would shoot more footage if the Kickstarter campaign raised more than £6,057 (meaning 14 hours' worth of footage), although ultimately this did not happen.

Shackleton told The Daily Telegraph that he hoped that crowdfunding a BBFC classification for the film would demonstrate how many people are concerned about film censorship in the UK, adding that the prospect of making the BBFC examiners watch paint dry was humorous. Shackleton acknowledged that Paint Drying would likely not have a large impact on film censorship within the UK, but nevertheless hoped that it would encourage people to debate the practices of the BBFC. He further said that people accepted the BBFC solely because of its age, claiming that if a similar organisation were to be founded today to censor literature or music, there would be public outrage. The Kickstarter campaign ended on 31 December 2015, having raised £5,936 from 686 backers—equating to 731 minutes (12 hours and 11 minutes) of footage, which was shortened to 10 hours and 7 minutes after Kickstarter's fees and value-added tax.

The campaign also received donations from people outside of the UK, which surprised Shackleton as he thought that non-British individuals would be confused about the BBFC's authority. He concluded that censorship was unfortunately a "pretty universal concept". Shackleton also stated that filmmakers from around the world, particularly Australia and India, were supportive of Paint Drying. Despite suggestions from backers for Shackleton to secretly insert a penis into a single frame of Paint Drying, he ultimately decided against it as he believed it would have detracted from the point of the film.

== Classification ==
The Digital Cinema Package that Shackleton submitted to the BBFC for classification was 310 gigabytes in size. Due to the length of the film, BBFC examiners split their viewing into two sessions over two consecutive days, the majority being viewed on 25 January. To coincide with the examination, Shackleton held an 'Ask Me Anything' (AMA) question and answer session on the subreddit r/IAmA, during which he stated that he did not himself watch the film in its entirety. Shackleton's post received hundreds of comments within a day and became top post on the subreddit on that day. On 26 January, upon reviewing the film, the BBFC rated it 'U' for 'Universal,' indicating "no material likely to offend or harm". After receiving a digital copy of the certificate, Shackleton tweeted that it was "£5,936 well spent".

In response to the protest, the BBFC said it would classify the film as it would any other submission. It added that "The BBFC is a non-profit organisation that works to protect children, from content which might raise harm risks and to empower the public, especially parents, to make informed viewing choices. It implements Classification Guidelines that reflect changing social attitudes towards media content through proactive public consultation and research." The BBFC also noted that its only source of income is the charges for its services. Paint Drying is not the longest film to have been rated by the BBFC—the French mystery film Out 1 (1971) is 773 minutes (12 hours, 55 minutes) long, and was classified by the BBFC in 2015. They rated it 15 for "very strong language".

== Reception ==
Although the film likely did not have any influence on the BBFC's governing, the novel idea of the film and the arguments raised by Shackleton have since been frequently discussed in the context of film censorship and classification. Paint Drying is the film that Shackleton is best known for. After the film was first classified by the BBFC, the A.V. Club said that a "14-hour director's cut is presumably forthcoming", and Gizmodo AU stated that uploading the film onto YouTube would be an ideal place for its "cinematic brilliance" to be permanently available for anyone to view. British magazine Dazed said that if Shackleton had allowed Paint Drying to be shown in cinemas, it would have been a great way to prank one's significant other on Valentine's Day. In the September 2016 issue of Alive, D.P. Sabharwal called the film "a novel and innovative protest". In an April 2017 opinion piece by National Post praising Shackleton's work, Calum Marsh declared Paint Drying a comedy and praised Shackleton's dedication to creating the film. Marsh stated that he was unsure about its merit as a film, but that as a comedy, "it's very, very good".

On 1 March 2016, Paint Drying was the subject of a video essay by the French series Blow Up, broadcast by Arte. In it, presenter Luc Lagier positively compares the film to Wavelength (1967), a structural film that consists of a gradually zooming-in shot of a room. Shackleton commented on the film's artistic analysis in May 2016, saying that he did not envision Paint Drying as an avant-garde film, but that he did consider it a work of art, "although in my mind the work of art was the performative act of the censors watching it." He later reflected on Paint Drying in an article he wrote for Vice in April 2017, in which he stated that the BBFC remained unchanged since his protest, and "continues to ban films outright". On 15 October 2018, Paint Drying was featured in an episode of series P of the British panel show QI. In 2022, academic Arina Pismenny referred to Paint Drying as an example of art that was objectively boring yet interesting given its context.

On the social film cataloging and reviewing website Letterboxd, there are several thousand user reviews for Paint Drying which consist solely of users sharing personal information unrelated to the film, such as traumatic experiences, personal events and life updates, treating it as a diary. Started by a user in July 2020, Shackleton was later made aware of the reviews by a friend and has stated that, although bizarre, he is simultaneously very fond of it, calling it an "unlikely second act" to Paint Drying. He later added that he feels like a "weird bystander" as none of the users leaving reviews have actually seen the film nor are familiar with his work, but that he also feels that it is "an incredible honour" to have unintentionally resulted in its creation. The media publication Hipersónica compared the profile for Paint Drying on Letterboxd to a bulletin board, and said it served as an example of the Letterboxd community's culture and attitude towards film reviewing.

== Release ==
Although Shackleton had no plans for a wide theatrical release, he stated on 25 January 2016 that he was in talks with a cinema in London about possibly showing the film. Shackleton planned for it to be followed by a public debate regarding film censorship. He later added that "it would take some working out, [in terms of] how to show it. I can't imagine that many people would make it through the entire duration", stating that it would have to be shown in a setting that could allow for people to walk in and out of the theatre. Ultimately, nothing came of these talks, and Paint Drying had its first public screening at the Queensland Art Gallery and Gallery of Modern Art in Brisbane, Australia, between 10–29 November 2023. It screened at the Gallery of Modern Art & Cinema building as part of the Cinema Obstructed artistic film exhibition, for which Shackleton was a co-curator alongside Australian-native Robert Hughes.

Paint Drying had its second public screening—and its first in Europe—as an art installation at the Cinema São Jorge in Lisbon, Portugal on 9 May 2025 during the IndieLisboa International Film Festival, which also screened three other films created by Shackleton. Admission was free and Shackleton was slated to make occasional appearances at the screening. It was shown on a "small private screen" in the Rank Room, where films were screened before being censored prior to their release during the Estado Novo era of Portugal.

As of February 2024, the film has not been released theatrically nor made publicly available online. In 2018, Paint Drying was archived in the BFI National Archive. The only public copy of the film, released on Blu-ray with custom artwork, was auctioned to an anonymous bidder for £800 in April 2024, which was donated to the Medical Aid for Palestinians charity in support of victims of the Israeli invasion of the Gaza Strip. In a November 2025 interview with NPR, when asked if Paint Drying was available on a streaming service, Shackleton said "sadly not, but … only for lack of offers. If Netflix wants to pick it up, they're more than welcome to."

== See also ==
- List of longest films
- Paracinema – Academic term for a variety of film genres out of the mainstream
- Satire film
- Slow cinema
