= Modern Vampires =

- Directed by: Richard Elfman
- Written by: Matthew Bright
- Produced by: Chris Hanley; Brad Wyman
- Starring: Casper Van Dien; Natasha Gregson Wagner; Rod Steiger; Kim Cattrall; Natasha Lyonne; Craig Ferguson; Natasha Andrejchenko; Udo Kier; Gabriel Casseus; Robert Pastorelli; Conchata Ferrell
- Cinematography: Robin Brown
- Edited by: Larry Bock
- Music by: Michael Wandmacher; Danny Elfman
- Release date: 1998
- Running time: 91 minutes
- Country: United States
- Language: English

Modern Vampires (also known as Revenant) is a 1998 American black comedy-horror film written by Matthew Bright, directed by Richard Elfman and starring Casper Van Dien, Natasha Gregson Wagner, Kim Cattrall, Natasha Lyonne, Udo Kier and Rod Steiger. It was released direct to video on October 19, 1999.

== Plot ==
Vampire Dallas continuously bites people without permission from The Count. He is especially infuriated after Dallas turns Nico, a young serial killer. Twenty years after his exile, he returns to Los Angeles to visit his vampire friends: Ulrike, Vincent, Richard and Richard's wife Panthia. To celebrate Dallas's return, they decide to spend the night clubbing in one of The Count's vampire bars. The Count, however, is also there and threatens Dallas to leave town.

Dr. Van Helsing is after the band of vampires. Being too old to handle the extermination alone, he puts an ad in the newspaper for help. He gets Crips member Time Bomb, who does not believe in vampires but is willing to kill for money. The pair succeed in murdering Vincent. Twenty years before, Helsing's son Hans was good friends with Dallas. Dallas turned Hans into a vampire to save him from a fatal genetic disorder. After discovering this, Helsing killed Hans, vowing to destroy Dallas for what he did to his son. Helsing's wife committed suicide out of grief.

Dallas, having grown protective of Nico, drives around looking for her. After sharing a bit of each other's blood, Dallas reveals who he is and explains that the vampire community is out to get her, fearing her recklessness will expose the existence of vampires. After an attack by Van Hellsing and Time Bomb, Dallas takes Nico to live with Richard and Panthia, who clean her up and take her shopping for clothes. While the four go out one night, Nico befriends Rachel, a human woman. Returning home, they find Ulrike, who reveals Vincent's death to the others. Concluding that two hunters will not be enough against the vampires, Helsing and Time Bomb bring in three more Crips members - Soda Pop, L'il Monster, and Trigger.

Dallas decides to take Nico to see her mother's house, as Nico has little memory of her human life. Nico has him kill her abusive stepfather and exchanges heated words with her neglectful mother, who she claims never loved her. While leaving the trailer park, they are attacked by four of The Count's henchmen, whom they kill. While driving back, Dallas reveals that he was ordered to kill Helsing, but chose not to after befriending Hans. He hoped that by curing Hans he could change Helsing's attitude towards the vampire community. The Count then banished Dallas as punishment for not carrying out his order to kill him.

The next night, Nico gets a call from Rachel, who invites her out to party. Meanwhile, Dallas visits The Count and begs him to spare Nico. The Count once again threatens him to bring him Nico. With Nico and Dallas out, Helsing and his Crip employees storm the house and kill Richard and Panthia. They tie Ulrike to a bedpost, but she taunts the Crips into having sex with her before Helsing stakes her too. They are unaware that having sex with a vampire turns a person into a vampire. Nico returns, horrified at the carnage. She attacks Trigger and Rachel is accidentally shot, with Nico shooting Trigger in retaliation. Time Bomb subdues Nico as Dallas returns home, coming face to face with Helsing. Dallas offers to lead Helsing to The Count if he releases Nico. Helsing reluctantly agrees as they all head for The Count's house.

The Count's henchmen, however, intercept them. They take Nico and Helsing to The Count, who hooks up Nico to a blood-draining machine and places Helsing in a box with only his head sticking out. The Count is about to crack open Helsing's skull with a hammer, when Dallas drives the van through the club's wall. Dallas and the Crips, now vampires, come out, killing The Count and his henchmen. Afterwards, Nico is set free and Rachel, to save her life, has been turned into a vampire. Nico, Rachel, and Dallas decide to move to New York. A pajama-clad Helsing later runs down an alley, screaming for forgiveness from Hans and from God. He then screams for help, revealing vampire fangs in front of two police officers.

== Production ==
Production began during late June 1997 in Los Angeles, under the working title of Revenant. A few months later, work on the film was complete.

== Differences between R-rated and unrated versions ==
- The DVD version contains more explicit gore than the edited R-rated VHS release.
- In the Spanish DVD version by Manga Films, the title does not appear onscreen during the opening credits.

== Reception ==
The movie has received third place Best International Film award at the Fant-Asia Film Festival in 1997.

== See also ==
- Vampire film
