= Summer Camp (band) =

British musical duo

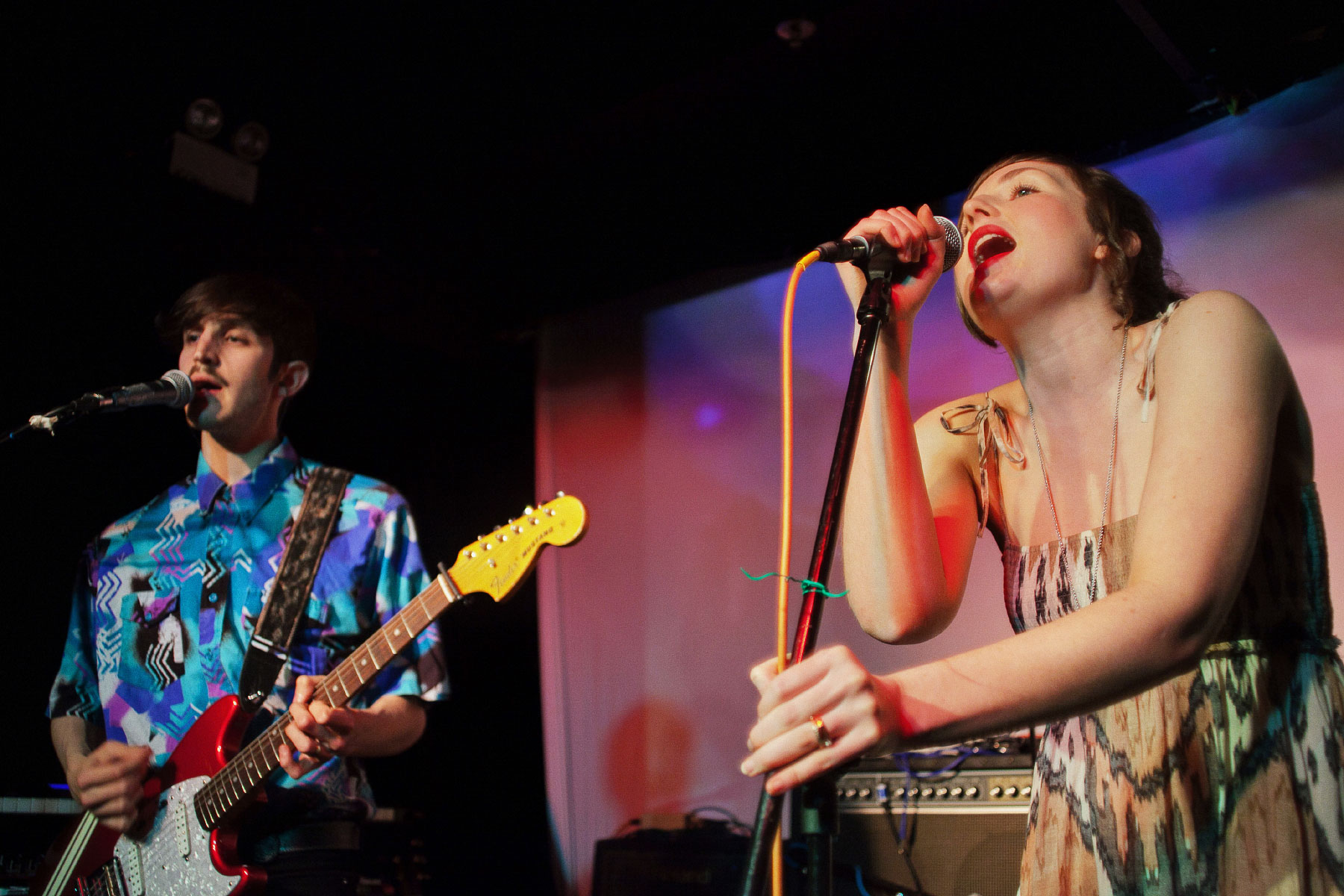
- Summer Camp performing in Hong Kong, 2012

Background information
- Origin: England
- Genres: Indie pop, synthpop, new wave, R&B
- Years active: 2009–2022
- Label: Moshi Moshi
- Members: Jeremy Warmsley; Elizabeth Sankey
- Website: Official website

Summer Camp were a British indie pop duo, formed in October 2009 by married couple multi-instrumentalist Jeremy Warmsley and vocalist Elizabeth Sankey. They are signed to the Moshi Moshi label on which they have released all four of their full-length albums, as well as three EPs and a film soundtrack.

== Musical style ==
Summer Camp's musical style has been described as "21st-century alt.pop", but also is influenced by 1960s girl groups and 1980s synthpop. The lyrics, written by Sankey, are often quite dark and deal with failed relationships, conflicts, treasure and teenage obsessions. Along with the band's artwork and music videos they also draw heavily from American culture from the 1960s–1980s.

== History ==
They started after recording a cover version of I Only Have Eyes for You, a song which Elizabeth had included on a mixtape given to Jeremy. They uploaded their version to Myspace, and claimed to be a seven-piece from Sweden. Their first EP, Young, was released in 2010. In 2011, they released their debut LP, Welcome To Condale, produced by Pulp member Steve Mackey, a concept album set in the fictional town of Condale. In 2013, they worked with Britpop producer Stephen Street on their self-titled second album.

In 2014, they released their soundtrack to Beyond Clueless, a teen movie documentary directed by critic Charlie Lyne. This was followed in 2015 by their third studio album, Bad Love.

In 2019, band member Elizabeth Sankey released a film, Romantic Comedy, a documentary about the genre. In 2020, the band released an album of the same name made up of songs "from and inspired by" Sankey's film.

In 2022, Summer Camp announced their decision to disband.

== Discography ==
=== Albums ===
- Welcome to Condale, 31 October 2011, Moshi Moshi, 2011 (digital, CD, 12")
- Summer Camp, 9 September 2013, Moshi Moshi, 2013 (digital, CD, 12")
- Beyond Clueless (original soundtrack), 4 August 2014, Moshi Moshi, 2014 (digital, 12")
- Bad Love, 25 May 2015, Moshi Moshi, 2015 (digital, CD, 12")
- Romantic Comedy, 14 February 2020, Moshi Moshi, 2020 (digital, 12")

=== EPs ===
- Young, September 6, 2010, Moshi Moshi (digital, CD)
- Always, June 29, 2012, Apricot (digital, 10")
- Christmas, December 1, 2015, Moshi Moshi (digital)

=== Singles ===
- "Ghost Train" – 12 April 2010, Moshi Moshi (digital, 1000 run 7")
- "Round The Moon" – 6 September 2010, Moshi Moshi (digital, 1000 run 7")
- "Better Off Without You" - 2011, Moshi Moshi (digital)
- "Down" - October 2011, Moshi Moshi (digital)
