= Watching paint dry =

Idiomatic English expression

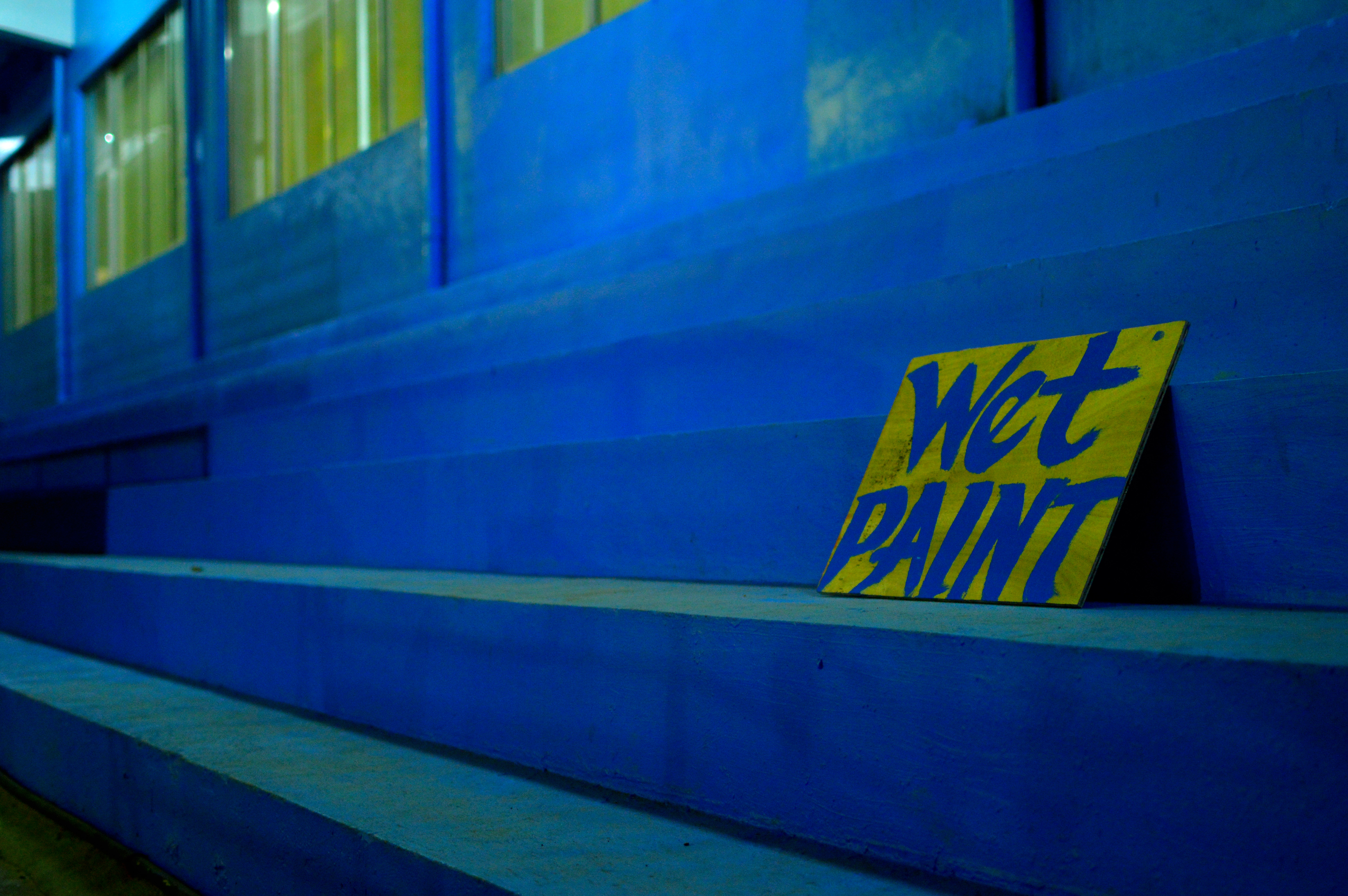
A sign warning of wet paint

"Like watching paint dry" is an English-language idiom describing an activity as being particularly boring or tedious. It is believed to have originated in the United States. A similar phrase is "watching grass grow".

== Media ==
In 1959, Geoffrey Warren of the Los Angeles Times wrote that a theatrical presentation of The Shrike was "as exciting as watching paint dry". In 1969, sports announcer Red Barber warned that, due to the dominance of pitchers over batters, baseball at that time was "as exciting as watching paint dry."

The expression was well known by the late 20th century and has led to real-life activities. In 2012, the World Watching Paint Dry championships were held by online trade merchants localtraders.com to promote various brands of paint. Entries were received from all over the world.

External videos
- 10-hour amateur YouTube video of drying paint

In 2016, director Charlie Shackleton released a 10-hour-and-7-minute-long film of paint drying titled Paint Drying as a protest against the requirement for the British Board of Film Classification to approve films, and charge per minute for their obligatory service. The board had to watch all of it to be able to classify it (it was given a U certificate, "suitable for all"), charging £5,936.

In 2018, the artist Arvid Boecker exhibited his work Watching Paint Dry at the Kunstverein Brackenheim, Brackenheim, Germany.

The television station HGTV was criticised in 2020 for featuring coverage of people watching paint dry as interludes between segments on renovation shows such as Home Town and Fixer Upper.

== Science ==
Observing the process of paint drying has been found to be important in the development of modern environmentally friendly water-based paint, replacing earlier solvent-derived paints and coatings. The drying process is observed in order to better understand how aqueous material dries on the surface being painted, and forms a protective layer. This is particularly important for the marine and shipbuilding industry, to develop eco-friendly coatings that comply with increasingly strict regulations.

Charles Tomlinson delivered a lecture on the "Drying Properties of Various Kinds of House Paint" to the Royal Society of Arts in 1869, concluding that paint dries due to the absorption of oxygen and thus solidifies as a result. In 2008, a lecture titled "Why Watching Paint Dry Is Interesting" published by the Royal Society of Chemistry presented the chemistry and technology used in various marine paints. In 2016, scientists at the University of Surrey and the Université Claude Bernard set up a computer simulation of paint drying, showing that it forms into two layers spontaneously as small particles in the paint combine and push away larger ones. This could lead to improved performance of future coatings.

== See also ==
- The dictionary definition of watch paint dry at Wiktionary
