= Elizabeth Sankey =

British filmmaker and musician

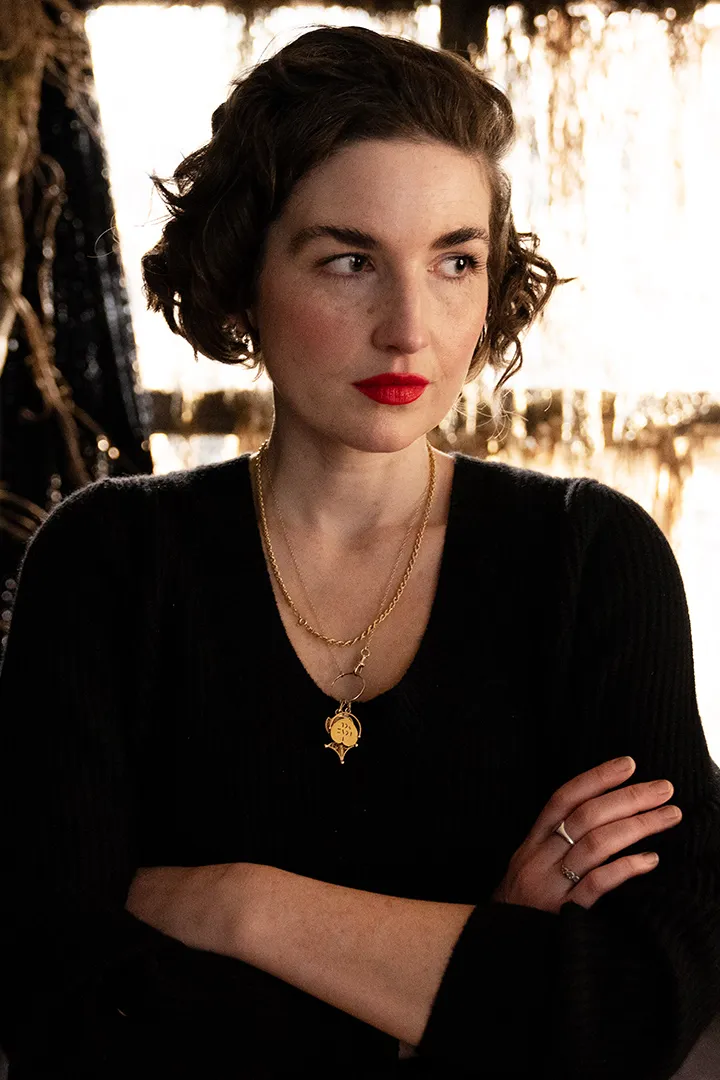
- Elizabeth Sankey in 2023
- Born: 2 October 1984 (age 41)

Elizabeth Sankey is a British filmmaker and musician, best known for her film Romantic Comedy. and for playing in the indie-pop band Summer Camp.

== Music career ==
As part of Summer Camp she has released four albums and the soundtrack to the film Beyond Clueless.

== Films ==
Her debut feature film, Romantic Comedy, premiered at South By Southwest and was distributed in the UK by MUBI. It consists of clips from hundreds of pre-existing films, with narration by Sankey exploring the history of the genre, intercut with interviews with other contributors including Jessica Barden, Charlie Lyne and Laura Snapes

In 2024, she wrote and directed the film Witches.
