= Anthony Ing =

British-Canadian experimental filmmaker

- Born: 1991 (age 34–35)
- Occupation: Experimental filmmaker
- Known for: Jill, Uncredited (2023)

Anthony Ing (born 1991) is a British-Canadian experimental filmmaker known for their 2023 documentary short Jill, Uncredited, about film and television actress Jill Goldston, known primarily for playing an extra.

== Career ==
Ing is one of the co-founders (alongside fellow video essayists Charlie Shackleton and Catherine Bray) of Loop, a production outfit with a range of artist-led projects since 2014.

== Filmography ==
=== Director ===
- Jill, Uncredited (2023)
- The Gallery (2019)
- Day After Day (2016)

=== Producer ===
- Fish Story (2017)
- Copycat (2015)
- Beyond Clueless (2014)

=== Editor ===
- Guilt-Free Pleasures (2020)
