= Romantic Comedy (2019 film) =

- Film poster
- Directed by: Elizabeth Sankey
- Produced by: Jeremy Warmsley; Oskar Pimlott; Maria Chiara Ventura
- Edited by: Elizabeth Sankey
- Music by: Summer Camp, Jeremy Warmsley
- Release dates: 25 January 2019 (IFFR); 9 March 2020 (UK)
- Running time: 78 minutes.
- Country: United Kingdom
- Language: English

Romantic Comedy is a 2019 British documentary film about romantic comedies, directed, edited and narrated by Elizabeth Sankey, whose band Summer Camp contributes songs. Sankey's bandmate Jeremy Warmsley co-produced and composed the film's original score.

== Synopsis ==
The film features extracts from hundreds of films, including The Holiday, When Harry Met Sally, While You Were Sleeping, The Big Sick, Kissing Jessica Stein and The Broken Hearts Club. The production made use of Fair Use guidelines to legally include these clips.

Other contributors to the film include actor Jessica Barden, director Charlie Lyne, writers Laura Snapes, Anne T Donahue, Simran Hans, Cameron Cook, Brodie Lancaster and radio producer Eleanor McDowall.

== Release ==
The film premiered at IFFR 2019 and went on to play at festivals such as SXSW 2019 and AFI. It was distributed in the UK by MUBI.

== Reception ==
As of October 2021, Romantic Comedy holds a rating of 93% on Rotten Tomatoes, based on 15 reviews. The Guardian reviewed Romantic Comedy, rating it 4/5 stars and writing "engaging documentary reclaims the genre from snooty cinephiles – and proudly pronounces When Harry Met Sally a masterpiece".
