= Spring Breakers =

2012 comedy film directed by Harmony Korine

- Theatrical release poster
- Directed by: Harmony Korine
- Written by: Harmony Korine
- Produced by: Chris Hanley; Jordan Gertner; David Zander; Charles-Marie Anthonioz
- Starring: James Franco; Selena Gomez; Vanessa Hudgens; Ashley Benson; Rachel Korine; Gucci Mane
- Cinematography: Benoît Debie
- Edited by: Douglas Crise
- Music by: Skrillex; Cliff Martinez
- Production companies: Muse Productions; Annapurna Pictures; Division Films; Radar Productions
- Distributed by: A24
- Release dates: September 4, 2012 (Venice); March 22, 2013 (United States)
- Running time: 94 minutes
- Country: United States
- Language: English
- Budget: $5 million
- Box office: $31.7 million

Spring Breakers is a 2012 American crime drama film written and directed by Harmony Korine. Starring James Franco, Selena Gomez, Vanessa Hudgens, Ashley Benson, Rachel Korine, and Gucci Mane, it follows four college-aged girls who go on spring break in St. Petersburg, Florida and descend into a world of drugs, crime, and violence after meeting an eccentric local drug dealer.

Harmony Korine had developed the concept over several years prior to production, with fleeting ideas about the plot and what should transpire. His initial desire was to create a "sensory film" that was more about feeling than action; he placed little importance on narrative or plot, the idea for which came later. Once Korine developed the story's backbone, which takes place around the American spring break period, he traveled to Florida to write the screenplay. Production began in 2012. It is one of Korine's first theatrical works to receive a wide release.

Spring Breakers was released on March 22, 2013, in the United States by A24 and received generally positive reviews from critics, with praise for the acting and Debie's cinematography. It grossed $31 million worldwide on a $5 million budget and has been described as a cult classic. The film was selected to compete for the Golden Lion at the 69th Venice International Film Festival. A sequel is in development.

== Plot ==
College students Brit, Candy, and Cotty often spend their time partying while their friend Faith attends a religious youth group. As their classmates head to spring break, they are stuck behind because they don't have the money to travel. Desperate to make the trip, Brit and Candy get high on cocaine, don ski masks, and rob a local restaurant, using the threat of hammers and realistic-looking squirt guns. They are assisted by Cotty, who drives (and later burns) the getaway car stolen from one of their professors. Cotty, Candy, and Brit divulge the details of their crime to a horrified Faith, who keeps quiet about it.

In St. Petersburg, Florida, the girls attend wild beach parties fueled by alcohol, drugs, and sex. After a particularly wild party, all four are arrested for using narcotics. They spend the night in a holding cell, but are bailed out by Alien, a rapper, drug hustler, and arms dealer. Alien charms Cotty, Candy, and Brit with his money and "bad boy" swagger, but Faith is extremely uncomfortable. Alien takes the girls to a local club frequented by gang members, where Faith becomes even more uneasy. Alien attempts to seduce Faith and convince her to stay with him, using equal parts menace, threats, and tenderness, but Faith leaves, begging the others to come with her. They refuse, and she returns to college alone.

Alien takes the remaining girls to a strip club owned by his rival and childhood best friend, Big Arch, who warns Alien to stop selling drugs in his territory. Alien takes the girls to his mansion, where he flaunts his drug money and cache of weapons, describing his life as the "American Dream". Brit and Candy grab two of his guns and threaten to kill him. Aroused, Alien fellates the guns and declares that he has fallen in love with the girls, claiming that they are his soulmates.

Alien arms the girls with pink ski masks and shotguns and takes them to his pool, where the girls ask him to play something inspiring on the piano. They sing Britney Spears' "Everytime", while a montage plays of them performing several armed robberies. While in Alien's car, they are approached by Big Arch and another member of his gang who threaten them and execute a drive-by shooting, wounding Cotty in the process. Alien promises to retaliate, but a traumatized Cotty comes to her senses and chooses to return to college. Brit and Candy stay behind and have three-way sex with Alien in his pool. The three decide to take revenge on Big Arch. In a flashforward, the two girls call home, promising to work harder and become better people.

In the present, the three take a motorboat to Big Arch's mansion. After they dock at the pier, Alien is immediately shot and killed by one of Big Arch's guards. Brit and Candy carry on, killing the rest of the members before confronting and killing Big Arch. The camera pans over the dead bodies of Big Arch's gang while the girls speak in a voice-over, first heard earlier in the film, describing the beach's beauty and musing that they have discovered who they truly are. Brit and Candy, silent and wearing pensive, ambiguous expressions, drive to college in Big Arch's Lamborghini. A final flashback shows the two girls kissing Alien's dead body before departing.

== Cast ==
- James Franco as Alien, a rapper, drug hustler, and arms dealer who takes the girls under his wing.
- Selena Gomez as Faith, who tries to devote her life to Christianity but is also friends with party girls Brit, Candy and Cotty.
- Vanessa Hudgens as Candy, an irresponsible and uncaring college girl and Brit's best friend.
- Ashley Benson as Brit, a rebellious and danger-seeking college girl, also Candy's best friend.
- Rachel Korine as Cotty, a girl who likes to party but is more careful than her friends Candy and Brit.
- Gucci Mane as Archie, Alien's childhood best friend who has become a rival drug dealer.

Additionally, Heather Morris, Ash Lendzion, and Emma Holzer appear as Faith's friends Bess, Forest, and Heather. Jeff Jarrett portrays a youth pastor, Russell Stuart appears as a DJ, and Houston-area sports writer John McClain appears as a judge.

== Production ==
=== Casting ===
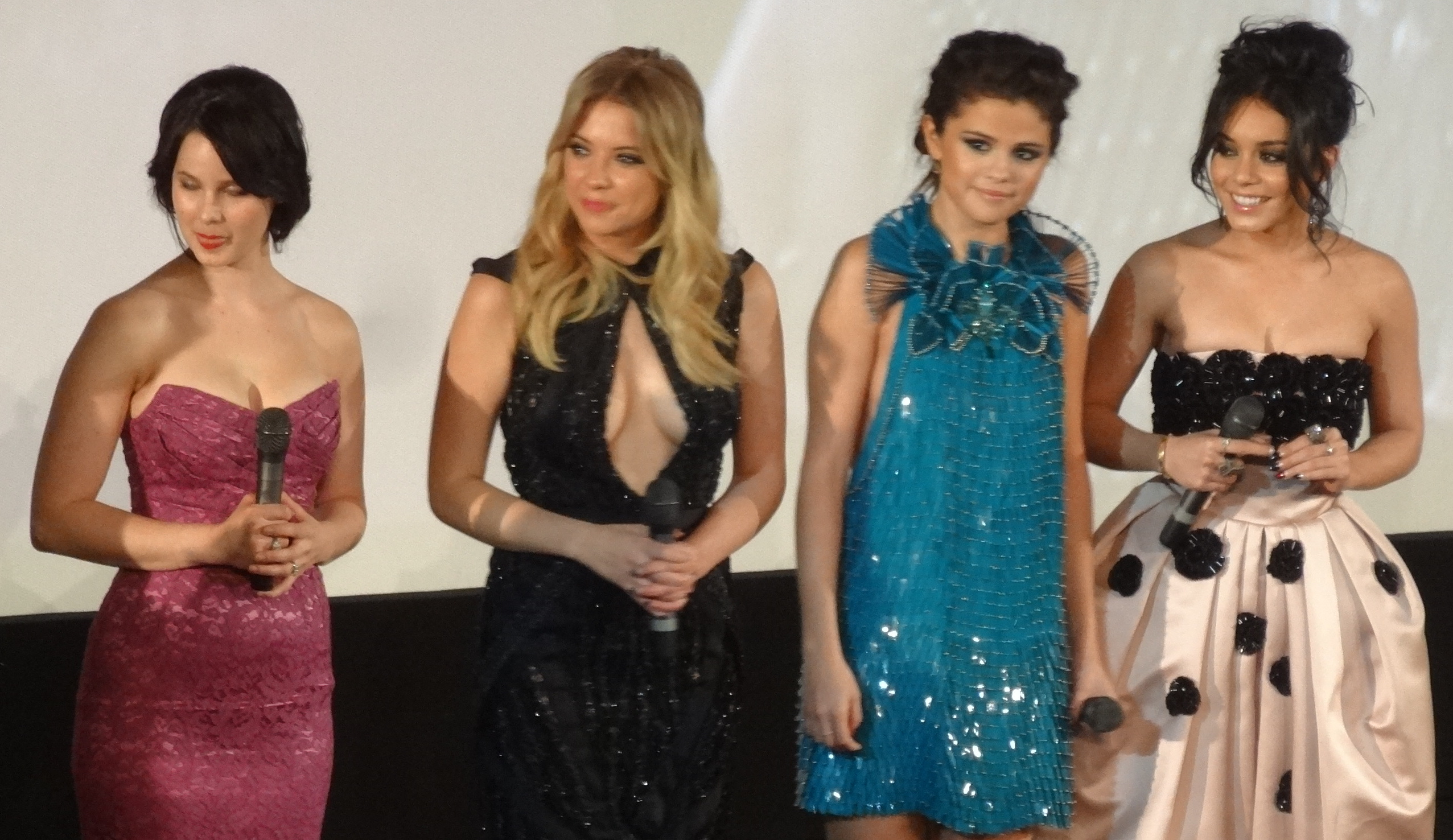
A part of the main cast at the film's premiere in Paris in February 2013: Rachel Korine, Ashley Benson, Selena Gomez and Vanessa Hudgens.

According to Harmony Korine, he wrote the film partially to make up for his own spring breaks. As a youth he had been fully devoted to skateboarding, and missed out on what he later saw as opportunities for hedonistic pursuits. Korine has referred to the film as a "beach noir".

The original lineup of lead actresses was announced as Emma Roberts, Selena Gomez and Vanessa Hudgens. Director Korine had purposely collected a group of well-known young actresses with a similar reputation to Roberts in Hollywood. Roberts ultimately dropped out due to discomfort with the film's sexual content, and was replaced by Ashley Benson.

=== Filming ===
The film was shot in March and April 2012 in and around St. Petersburg, Florida. The exterior shots and some interior shots of the college that Gomez and Benson attend were filmed at New College of Florida. Dormitory and classroom shots were filmed at Ringling College of Art and Design. Korine announced in 2013 he planned to "remix" the film's unused footage and alternate takes into an entirely new cut.

== Soundtrack ==
The film score to Spring Breakers was composed by Cliff Martinez and Skrillex, marking the first scoring assignment for the latter. Skrillex was contacted after Korine sent music supervisor Randall Poster links to the electronica artist's music on YouTube. "I'm accustomed to being the oldest person at a gig," said Poster, "but when I went to see Skrillex at Roseland this year, it was dramatic. There were a lot of kids that looked like they were 15 years old. But I loved it. I truly loved it."

The soundtrack to the film was released on March 19, 2013 by Big Beat Records and Warner Music.

== Release ==
A three-minute preview of Spring Breakers was released at the 2012 Cannes Film Festival in May 2012. The entire film premiered at the 69th Venice International Film Festival on September 4, 2012. The film was released in New York and Los Angeles on March 15, 2013. The film was released nationwide on March 22, 2013.

The film had a limited release in the U.K. on April 5, 2013. The movie was also released in France on March 6, 2013 and was scheduled to be released in Australia in early March; however, it was pushed back to a release date of May 4.

=== Home media ===
Spring Breakers was released digitally on June 25, 2013, and on DVD and Blu-ray on July 9, 2013.

== Reception ==
=== Box office ===
Spring Breakers grossed $14,124,284 in North America and $17,600,000 in other countries for a worldwide total of $31,724,284. In North America, the film opened to #6 in its first weekend with $4,858,944, behind The Croods, Admission, The Call, Oz the Great and Powerful, and Olympus Has Fallen.

=== Critical response ===
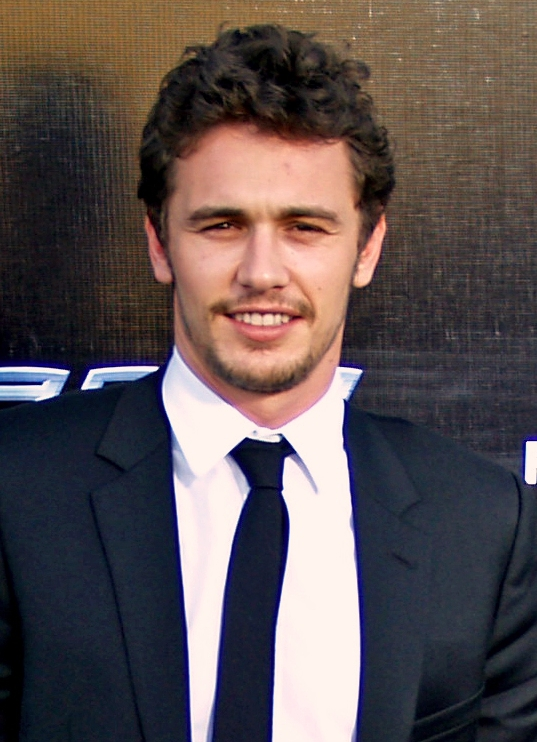
The performance of James Franco earned praise from critics. A24 started a campaign to support him for a nomination for the Academy Award for Best Supporting Actor.

On review aggregator Rotten Tomatoes, the film holds an approval rating of 67% based on 198 reviews, with an average rating of 6.5/10. The website's critical consensus reads, "Spring Breakers blends stinging social commentary with bikini cheesecake and a bravura James Franco performance." At Metacritic, which assigns a weighted mean rating from film critics, it received a rating score of 63 out of 100 based on 40 critics, indicating "generally favorable reviews".

Xan Brooks of The Guardian said the film is Korine's "most fully realised, purely satisfying feature film since Gummo." Emma Seligman of The Huffington Post described the film as "Scarface meets Britney Spears." Oliver Lyttlelton of IndieWire gave the film a B, stating that the film would be a future cult favorite for "midnight moviegoers".

Guy Lodge of Variety gave it a negative review, saying, "this attractively fizzy pic may be a shock to the system for fans of teen queens Selena Gomez and Vanessa Hudgens, but remains pretty toothless titillation by its writer-helmer's standards." David Rooney of The Hollywood Reporter noted that James Franco gives one of his more bizarre performances in his unpredictable career, saying "he's a cross between Bo Derek in 10 and Richard Kiel in Moonraker."

Andrew Schenker of Slant Magazine gave the film 3 out of 4 stars. Jamie Dunn of The Skinny gave it 4 out of 5 stars, saying: "If Michael Mann was to take a lot of hallucinogenics and shoot a Girls Gone Wild video, it might look something like this." Richard Roeper of Rogerebert.com gave the film three-and-a-half stars out of four, praising the character of Alien and the film's sense of humor.

A24 began a campaign in September 2013 in support of a Best Supporting Actor Oscar nomination for Franco's performance. This was preceded by the Hollywood.com website that produced a "For your consideration" poster in support of a nomination for Franco in March 2013. On December 2, 2013, A24 published a YouTube video titled "James Franco - Consider this Sh*t" and also released print advertisements following the "Consider this Sh*t [sic]" theme. Originally, Internet chatter considered the campaign a joke, but A24 emphasized that it was serious.

Spring Breakers has since appeared on various retrospective "best of" lists, including two honoring the best films of the 21st century. In 2016, British film magazine Little White Lies placed the film at number 40 on their list of the 50 best films of the decade (so far). In August of that same year, BBC Magazine conducted a poll on the 21st century's 100 greatest films so far, with Spring Breakers ranking at number 74. In France, the magazine Les Cahiers du cinéma featured Spring Breakers on their March 2013's cover, and placed it second on their December 2013 Top Ten chart. In July 2025, it ranked number 41 on Rolling Stone's list of "The 100 Best Movies of the 21st Century." It was also one of the films voted for the "Readers' Choice" edition of The New York Times' list of "The 100 Best Movies of the 21st Century," finishing at number 321.

==== Top ten lists ====
Spring Breakers appeared on many critics' top ten lists for 2013.

- Best of 2013 (not ranked) – Mark Olsen, Los Angeles Times
- 2nd – Nigel M. Smith, Gabe Toro, & Katie Walsh, Indiewire
- 2nd – Cahiers du cinéma
- 4th – Ben Kenigsberg, The A.V. Club
- 6th – David Ehrlich, Film.com
- 6th – Gregory Ellwood, HitFix
- 7th – Drew McWeeny, Hitfix
- 8th – Ty Burr, The Boston Globe
- 8th – Kristopher Tapley, HitFix
- 8th – Marlow Stern, The Daily Beast
- 10th – Joshua Rothkopf, Time Out New York
- 10th – A.O. Scott, The New York Times
- Best of 2013 (listed alphabetically, not ranked) – Manohla Dargis, The New York Times

=== Controversies ===
==== Riff Raff controversy ====
On February 15, 2012, Korine contacted rapper Riff Raff about appearing in an upcoming film, which later developed as Spring Breakers. Once the trailer was released, there was speculation that the character Alien was based on Riff Raff. According to Franco, Alien is based on the underground rap artist Dangeruss, who has a cameo in the film. "Of course, Harmony and I looked at some of Riff Raff's videos as inspiration, but he was one of a number of people we looked at. I would say the biggest influence on the role was this local, Florida rapper named Dangeruss. He's fairly unknown, but he was down there in the place, living the life, and he became the biggest model for me, and he's in the movie."

After much back-and-forth about the issue, Riff Raff announced in July 2013 that he was suing the creators of Spring Breakers for $10 million for "sampling" his life without his permission or a proper producer credit. However, a September 2013 search by LA Weekly for court documents resulted in no findings.

==== Portrayal of women ====
Spring Breakers has generated debate and controversy among critics, with some regarding the film as sexist due to its objectification of women, while others viewed the film as a feminist or female-empowerment film. In regard to the former perspective, Heather Long in The Guardian suggests that the film "reinforces rape culture" and "turns young women into sex objects." Other reviewers state that it "pushes booze-and-bikini hedonism to the extreme," as the "camera glides up, down, and around these women's bodies like a giant tongue". According to Josh Eells in Rolling Stone, the film presents "a kind of girl-power camaraderie that could almost be called feminist," a result of the director's intent to "do the most radical work, but put it out in the most commercial way (...) to infiltrate the mainstream". In his review of the film, Richard Roeper wrote:

"Korine's camera is nearly an intrusive weapon as he lingers over the soft, limber bodies of Vanessa Hudgens, Selena Gomez, Ashley Benson, and his wife, Rachel Korine.... I think that's sort of the point. When a pre-med student on spring break loses her top, drinks to the point of passing out, and grabs a willing lugnut by the ears for six hours of anonymous fun, is she setting the woman's movement back 40 years, or taking charge of her life like any man would do at that age?"

=== Accolades ===
Franco won the Los Angeles Film Critics Association Award for Best Supporting Actor (tied with Jared Leto for Dallas Buyers Club), National Society of Film Critics Award for Best Supporting Actor, and San Francisco Film Critics Circle Award for Best Supporting Actor, while the Washington D.C. Area Film Critics Association nominated him for its Best Supporting Actor award.

==== Awards and nominations ====
Award	Date of ceremony	Category	Recipient(s)	Result	Ref.
Alliance of Women Film Journalists Awards	December 19, 2013	Actress Most in Need of a New Agent	Ashley Benson, Selena Gomez, Vanessa Hudgens and Rachel Korine	Nominated	
Belgian Film Critics Association Awards	January 4, 2014	Grand Prix	Spring Breakers	Nominated	
Bravo Otto	September 17, 2014	Sexy Babe	Ashley Benson	Nominated	
Bravo Otto	September 17, 2014	Sexy Babe	Selena Gomez	Gold	
Bravo Otto	September 17, 2014	Sexy Babe	Vanessa Hudgens	Nominated	
Cahiers du Cinéma	November 26, 2013	Top 10 Lists	Spring Breakers	Runner-up	
Chicago Film Critics Association Awards	December 16, 2013	Best Supporting Actor	James Franco	Nominated	
Chicago Film Critics Association Awards	December 16, 2013	Best Original Score	Cliff Martinez and Skrillex	Nominated	
Detroit Film Critics Society Awards	December 13, 2013	Best Supporting Actor	James Franco	Nominated	
Dorian Awards	January 21, 2014	Film Performance of the Year — Actor	James Franco	Nominated	
Dublin Film Critics Circle Awards	December 20, 2013	Best Cinematography	Benoît Debie	8th Place	
Golden Trailer Awards	May 3, 2013	Trashiest Trailer	Spring Breakers, A24 Films, and Mark Woollen & Associates	Won	
Independent Spirit Awards	March 1, 2014	Best Cinematography	Benoît Debie	Nominated	
IndieWire Critics Poll	December 17, 2013	Best Film	Spring Breakers	11th Place	
IndieWire Critics Poll	December 17, 2013	Best Director	Harmony Korine	10th Place	
IndieWire Critics Poll	December 17, 2013	Best Supporting Actor	James Franco	Runner-up	
IndieWire Critics Poll	December 17, 2013	Best Original Score or Soundtrack	Cliff Martinez and Skrillex	Runner-up	
IndieWire Critics Poll	December 17, 2013	Best Cinematography	Benoît Debie	5th Place	
International Cinephile Society Awards	February 23, 2014	Best Picture	Spring Breakers	8th Place	
International Cinephile Society Awards	February 23, 2014	Best Supporting Actor	James Franco	Won	
International Cinephile Society Awards	February 23, 2014	Best Editing	Douglas Crise	Runner-up	
Los Angeles Film Critics Association Awards	December 8, 2013	Best Supporting Actor	James Franco	Won (Note: Tied with Jared Leto for Dallas Buyers Club.)	
MTV Millennial Awards	July 28, 2013	Iconic Movie	Spring Breakers	Nominated	
MTV Movie Awards	April 13, 2014	Best Kiss	Ashley Benson, James Franco, and Vanessa Hudgens	Nominated	
National Society of Film Critics Awards	January 4, 2014	Best Supporting Actor	James Franco	Won	
New York Film Critics Circle Awards	December 3, 2013	Best Supporting Actor	James Franco	Runner-up	
San Francisco Film Critics Circle Awards	December 15, 2013	Best Supporting Actor	James Franco	Won	
Toronto Film Critics Association Awards	December 17, 2013	Best Supporting Actor	James Franco	Runner-up	
Venice International Film Festival	September 8, 2012	Golden Lion	Harmony Korine	Nominated	
Venice International Film Festival	September 8, 2012	Future Film Festival Digital Award – Special Mention	Harmony Korine	Won	
Village Voice Film Poll	December 17, 2013	Best Supporting Actor	James Franco	Won	
Washington D.C. Area Film Critics Association Awards	December 9, 2013	Best Supporting Actor	James Franco	Nominated	

== Sequel ==
A sequel, under the name of Spring Breakers: The Second Coming, was announced on May 6, 2014, to have been written by Irvine Welsh and directed by Jonas Åkerlund. Welsh's script focused on a set of Spring Breakers coming into conflict with Christian extremists, and Wild Bunch originally slated the film to debut at the upcoming Cannes Film Festival. Upon the announcement, Franco released a statement saying that the sequel was "not being done with Harmony Korine or my consent" and that the producers were "capitalizing on that innovative film to make money on a weak sequel" and attempting to "make money off someone else's creativity".

By 2017, the project had been shelved in favor of a digital series for short-video platform Blackpills; the series never materialized, however, and Blackpills itself shut down after less than two years online. As a result, development on Spring Breakers: The Second Coming had restarted, with Harmony Korine, who would direct the 2019 film The Beach Bum, being open to directing and writing the sequel.

In May 2025, a sequel, Spring Breakers: Salvation Mountain, was officially announced, with Chris Hanley and Jordan Gertner of Muse Productions returning to produce. Matthew Bright, director of the 1996 cult film Freeway, will direct, while Bella Thorne, Ariel Martin, True Whitaker, and Grace Van Dien were announced to join the cast. However, in August 2026, Thorne would write and direct the sequel instead.
