= Men Go to Battle =

Men Go To Battle
- Theatrical release poster
- Directed by: Zachary Treitz
- Written by: Zachary Treitz; Kate Lyn Sheil
- Produced by: Steven Schardt
- Starring: Tim Morton; David Maloney; Kate Lyn Sheil; Rachel Korine; Steve Coulter
- Cinematography: Brett Jutkiewicz
- Edited by: Zachary Treitz
- Production company: Rooftop Films
- Distributed by: Film Movement
- Release date: April 17, 2015 (Tribeca Film Festival)
- Running time: 98 minutes
- Country: United States
- Language: English

Men Go To Battle is a 2015 American dark comedy-drama film directed by Zachary Treitz and written by Treitz and Kate Lyn Sheil. It stars Tim Morton, David Maloney, Rachel Korine (in her final film role), Sheil, and Steve Coulter. The film had its world premiere at the Tribeca Film Festival on April 17, 2015.

== Synopsis ==
In 1861, two brothers Francis and Henry Mellon (played by Tim Morton and David Maloney) try to grow crops on their inhospitable patch of land in Kentucky. The brothers play pranks on one another. Francis makes questionable decisions about money and managing the farm. As tensions run high, the two get into a fight that leads Henry to join the Northern side during the American Civil War, leaving Francis behind to manage the farm.

== Cast ==
- Tim Morton as Henry Mellon
- David Maloney as Francis Mellon
- Rachel Korine as Betsy Small
- Kate Lyn Sheil as Josephine Small
- Steve Coulter as Mr. Small
- Charlotte Arnold as Sissy Hamblin
- Turner Ross as Valentine Atkin

== Release ==
The film had its world premiere at the Tribeca Film Festival on April 17, 2015. Shortly after, it was announced that Film Movement had acquired U.S distribution rights to the film.

== Reception ==
Men Go To Battle received overall positive reviews from critics and has a “Fresh” score of 69% on Rotten Tomatoes based on 26 reviews.

Writing for RogerEbert.com, critic Godfrey Cheshire gave the film a negative review, noting that despite its American Civil War setting, the film lacked dramatic impact and historical authenticity. Cheshire described it as "Mumblecore Civil War," critiquing its minimalist narrative, contemporary-sounding dialogue, and underwhelming period atmosphere. He argued that the film’s naturalistic aesthetic failed to convincingly portray the era or the realities of war, stating, "War is not hell in Men Go to Battle. It’s barely anything." He also cited issues with the acting and period detail, asserting that the script and performances lacked the skill needed to effectively represent the time period. Overall, Cheshire concluded that the film squandered the rich thematic and historical potential of its setting.
