= Jill, Uncredited =

- Directed by: Anthony Ing
- Starring: Jill Goldston
- Release date: 2022
- Countries: United Kingdom; Canada
- Language: English

Jill, Uncredited is a 2022 British-Canadian experimental documentary short film by video essayist Anthony Ing about film and television actress Jill Goldston, known primarily for playing an extra since the 1960s.

== Summary ==
Made with support from the Canada Council for the Arts and based on interviews with Jill (born 1943), mother of the former Washington D.C.-based president of ABC News James Goldston, the film is constructed from excerpted clips ranging from The Elephant Man to Mr. Bean.

== Accolades ==
- Montreal International Documentary Festival 2023: Best National Short or Medium-Length (won)
