= Stand By for Tape Back-Up =

2015 British documentary film

Stand By For Tape Back-Up is a 2015 British documentary film by Scottish poet and performance artist Ross Sutherland.

== Summary ==
Consisting of recordings from an old VHS tape left by his late grandfather as the director looks back at his younger years.

== Production ==
Noted video essayist Charlie Shackleton worked on the essay film which used the degrading quality of VHS tapes.

== List of films and shows recorded ==
- The Wizard of Oz (played separately in reference to The Dark Side of the Rainbow)
- Fresh Prince of Bel Air
- Ghostbusters
- The Crystal Maze
- Advertisements for an uncertain hair product, Carefree, MTV Sports, Calypso lemonade, Rice Krispies, & National Westminster Bank
- Jaws
- Michael Jackson's Thriller
- A game between Newcastle United F.C. & Arsenal F.C., broadcast by MTV Sports

At 38 minutes in, the music video for Radio On from the album What You Are appears, but a malfunction in the tape causes this to be only barely recognizable.
