= The Afterlight (2021 film) =

2021 British art film by Charlie Shackleton

- Directed by: Charlie Shackleton
- Produced by: Catherine Bray; Anthony Ing; Charlie Shackleton
- Cinematography: Robbie Ryan
- Edited by: Charlie Shackleton
- Music by: Jeremy Warmsley
- Production company: Loop
- Release date: 15 October 2021 (BFI London Film Festival)
- Running time: 82 minutes
- Country: United Kingdom

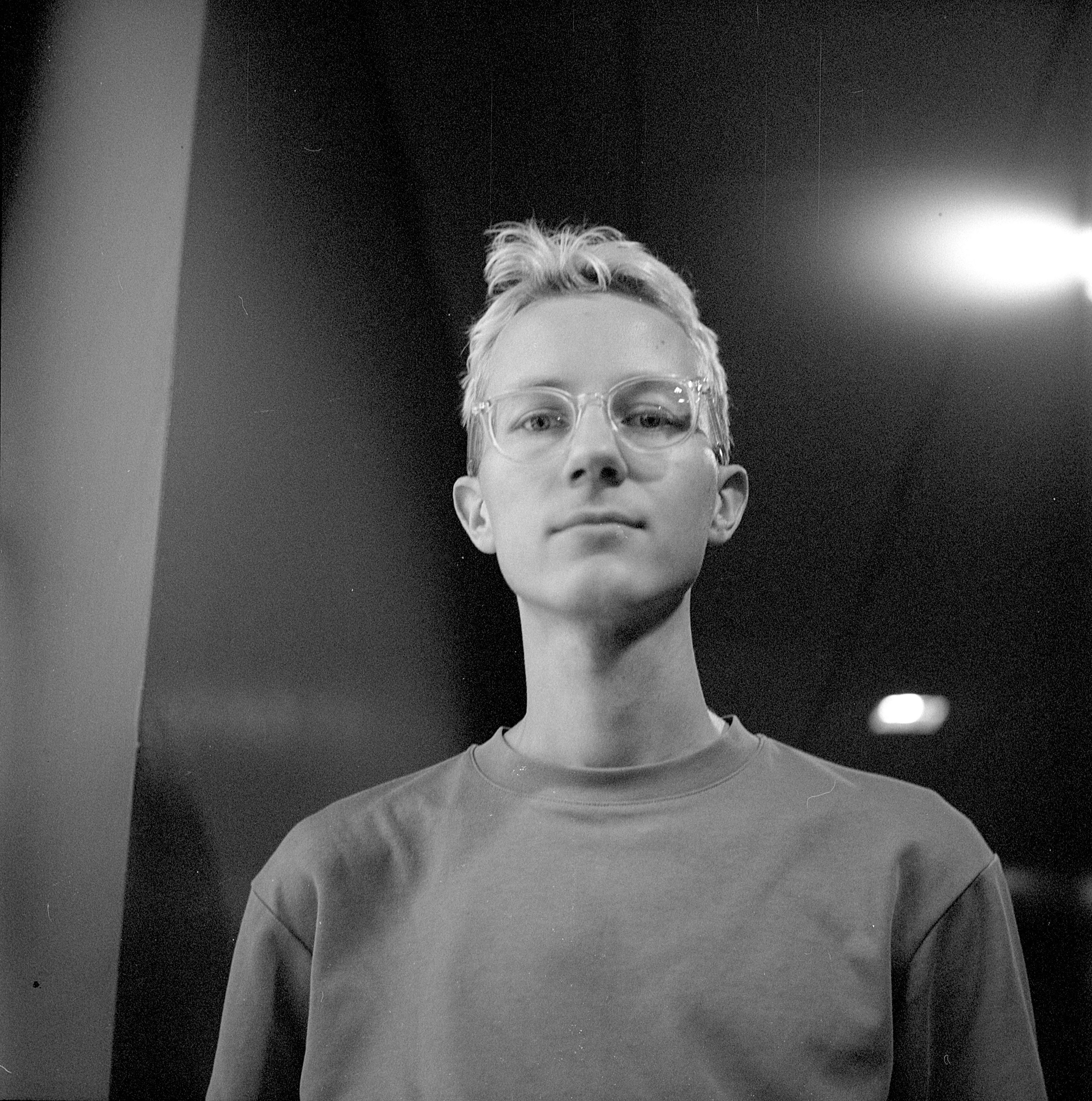
Shackleton in 2022, during a screening of The Afterlight

The Afterlight is a 2021 British experimental supercut art film directed and assembled by Charlie Shackleton.

== Summary ==
The film, produced by Catherine Bray, Anthony Ing and Shackleton, and distributed by their studio Loop, consists of scenes of actors from old films who are no longer alive. The only copy of the Afterlight exists on a single 35mm film print, so that every time the film plays it will gradually erode until eventually it will diminish entirely and become a lost film. Featuring cinematography from Robbie Ryan and composed of films from the 1960s or before, the film is entirely in black and white.

== Films featured on The Afterlight ==
- The Asphalt Jungle (1950)
- In a Lonely Place (1950)
- Late Spring (1949)

== Reception ==
Jonathan Romney, writing for the British Film Institute, gave a positive review of the Afterlight, stating that "placed together, the images evoke a post-death existence, perfect, poetic and yet irreducibly desolate," and favourably compared the film to the 2010 supercut art installation The Clock. Adrian Hui of the Michigan Daily gave a more mixed review, praising its concept and "seamless [editing] between shots from different films as if they were the same film and pieces of dialogue from different films," but stated that as an experimental film, the Afterlight was "not experimental enough," arguing that the film was "not quite bold enough in pushing the boundaries" of its source material.

== Release ==
The Afterlight had its world premiere at the BFI London Film Festival on 15 October 2021. As of June 2024, the film has screened publicly 56 times according to its official website:

=== Screenings ===
1. 15 October 2021: BFI London Film Festival, London, England
2. 17 October 2021: BFI London Film Festival, London, England
3. 6 November 2021: Cinecity: The Brighton Film Festival, Brighton, England
4. 10 November 2021: Leeds International Film Festival, Leeds, England
5. 25 November 2021: Cambridge Film Festival, Cambridge, England
6. 4 March 2022: Campus Theatre, Lewisburg, Pennsylvania, United States
7. 25 March 2022: Ann Arbor Film Festival, Ann Arbor, Michigan, United States
8. 31 March 2022: Copenhagen International Documentary Film Festival, Copenhagen, Denmark
9. 4 May 2022: Prismatic Ground, Queens, New York City, United States
10. 11 May 2022: Chicago Film Society, Chicago, Illinois, United States
11. 14 May 2022: Ragtag Cinema, Columbia, Missouri, United States
12. 16 May 2022: MDFF Selects, Toronto, Canada
13. 19 May 2022: Visuals, Montréal, Canada
14. 22 May 2022: Cleveland Institute of Art, Cleveland, Ohio, United States
15. 24 May 2022: Wexner Center for the Arts, Columbus, Ohio, United States
16. 26 May 2022: Bellwether Series, Amherst, Massachusetts, United States
17. 31 May 2022: George Eastman Museum, Rochester, New York, United States
18. 29 June 2022: BFI Southbank, London, England
19. 30 June 2022: King Street Cinema, Ipswich, England
20. 2 July 2022: Docs Ireland, Belfast, Northern Ireland
21. 3 July 2022: Irish Film Institute, Dublin, Ireland
22. 6 July 2022: The Electric, Birmingham, England
23. 10 July 2022: Broadway Cinema, Nottingham, England
24. 14 July 2022: HOME, Manchester, England
25. 17 July 2022: Chapter Arts Centre, Cardiff, Wales
26. 22 July 2022: Watershed, Bristol, England
27. 24 July 2022: Tyneside Cinema, Newcastle upon Tyne, England
28. 27 July 2022: Glasgow Film Theatre, Glasgow, Scotland
29. 29 July 2022: Edinburgh Filmhouse, Edinburgh, Scotland
30. 31 July 2022: Genesis Cinema, London, England
31. 2 August 2022: Roxie Theater, San Francisco, California, United States
32. 7 August 2022: Melbourne International Film Festival, Melbourne, Australia
33. 9 August 2022: Melbourne International Film Festival, Melbourne, Australia
34. 18 August 2022: QAGOMA, Brisbane, Australia
35. 20 August 2022: Art Gallery of New South Wales, Sydney, Australia
36. 23 August 2022: Aero Theatre, Los Angeles, California, United States
37. 17 September 2022: Camden International Film Festival, Camden, Maine, United States
38. 7 October 2022: Refocus Film Festival, Iowa City, Iowa, United States
39. 8 October 2022: Refocus Film Festival, Iowa City, Iowa, United States
40. 15 October 2022: Widescreen Weekend, Bradford, England
41. 21 October 2022: Museum of the Moving Image, Queens, New York, United States
42. 24 October 2022: Yale Film Archive, New Haven, Connecticut, United States
43. 1 November 2022: The Grand Illusion, Seattle, Washington, United States
44. 25 November 2022: Austrian Film Museum, Vienna, Austria
45. 6 February 2023: Warwick Student Cinema, Coventry, England
46. 2 March 2023: Showroom Cinema, Sheffield, England
47. 10 March 2023: DCA, Dundee, Scotland
48. 29 March 2023: Forum Cinema, Hexham, England
49. 6 April 2023: Lux, Nijmegen, Netherlands
50. 10 June 2023: BFI Southbank, London, England
51. 14 July 2023: Municipal Museum, Marienbad, Czech Republic
52. 21 November 2023: The Regent, Christchurch, England
53. 30 November 2023: The Ultimate Picture Palace, Oxford, England
54. 10 April 2024: Kino Iluzjon, Warsaw, Poland
55. 15 April 2024: Kino Iluzjon, Warsaw, Poland
56. 12 May 2024: Hyde Park Picture House, Leeds, England
57. 15 November 2024: Romuva Cinema, Kaunas, Lithuania

== Loss ==
After its screening at the Hyde Park Picture House, the 35mm print disappeared in transit to Lisbon, where it was due to be screened at the Cinemateca Portuguesa. Shackleton initially declared the film lost in a post on X, but announced two weeks later that the print had arrived in Lisbon.

== See also ==
- Bill Morrison - American experimental filmmaker similar in content
- List of black-and-white films produced since 1966
- Film preservation
- nostalgia - 1971 Hollis Frampton film similar in structure
