= Freeway II: Confessions of a Trickbaby =

1999 film by Matthew Bright

- Promotional poster
- Directed by: Matthew Bright
- Written by: Matthew Bright
- Produced by: Brad Wyman; Chris Hanley
- Starring: Natasha Lyonne; María Celedonio; Vincent Gallo; David Alan Grier; Michael T. Weiss; John Landis; Max Perlich
- Cinematography: Joel Ransom
- Edited by: Suzanne Hines
- Music by: Kennard Ramsey; Louise Post
- Production companies: The Kushner-Locke Company; Davis Film; Muse/Brad Wyman; Incognito Entertainment
- Distributed by: Full Moon Entertainment; Trick Productions Inc.
- Release dates: September 10, 1999 (TIFF); October 19, 1999 (United States)
- Running time: 97 minutes
- Countries: United States; Mexico
- Language: English

Freeway II: Confessions of a Trickbaby is a 1999 black comedy crime thriller film written and directed by Matthew Bright. The sequel to Freeway (1996), it stars Natasha Lyonne as Crystal "White Girl" Van Meter and María Celedonio as Angela "Cyclona" Garcia. While the first film was partly inspired by "Little Red Riding Hood", the second film is somewhat based on "Hansel and Gretel". It was an international co-production between the United States and Mexico.

In the film, 15-year-old prostitute White Girl is imprisoned for robbing her customers. She escapes from a minimal-security hospital, alongside 16-year-old serial killer Cyclona. Cyclona promises that her new partner (and love interest) White Girl can get medical help by Cyclona's former caretaker Sister Gomez. Sister Gomez turns out to be a witch, cult leader, cannibal and child pornographer.

== Plot ==
Crystal "White Girl" Van Meter is a 15-year-old prostitute who is sentenced to 25 years for a long list of crimes that include beating up and robbing her customers. Transferred to a minimum security hospital to seek treatment for bulimia, White Girl teams up with Angela "Cyclona" Garcia, a lesbian teenage serial killer. Together, they escape from the hospital. Cyclona is convinced her beloved former caretaker Sister Gomez, who has protected her from abuse in the past, can help White Girl with her eating disorder and they head to Tijuana. On the way, Cyclona murders a family and has sex with the dead bodies.

White Girl is not happy that Cyclona has stopped taking her medication and urges her to continue taking occasional doses should they continue together. They steal the family's car and make their way south. On the way, Cyclona reveals how Sister Gomez saved her from being molested by her father and possibly aliens. After drinking one too many beers and huffing some paint, they crash and fall down a hill laughing.

Undaunted, the two fugitives catch a ride on a freight train only to be assaulted by a transient crack addict. Cyclona kills him to protect White Girl, and the two flee with his bag of crack and guns. Venturing into the woods, they leave a trail of crack which is picked away by shady men with crow feathers on their hats. Lost and confused, they make it to the border only to have a stand-off with two customs officials, both of whom Cyclona kills. Although White Girl is angry that Cyclona has murdered two law-enforcement officials, the two girls race to the suburbs of Tijuana.

Upon their arrival in Tijuana, White Girl makes money by luring men to dark alleys on the promise of sex and mugging them. After they check into a run-down motel, White Girl finally gives in to Cyclona's sexual advances and the two of them become lovers. A few days later, the two lovers find a poster that shows Sister Gomez is in town. They visit Sister Gomez, who appears to be a Catholic/spiritualist healer, at her gaudy mission house. Sister Gomez prepares a large feast for her "little movie star" (Cyclona) and the friend with "the hungry demon" (Crystal), referring to her bulimia.

Cyclona disappears as White Girl is forced to work for Sister Gomez in the same way as she has been doing, in exchange for food. White Girl grows suspicious and makes her way to the basement, where she finds small children in a bondage room. Cyclona is hanging half-nude in a bondage-style contraption. She tells White Girl that Sister Gomez made her watch while she killed children and made food out of them. She reveals that her ultimate plan was to fatten White Girl up with the meat of the children, and then serve White Girl up for dinner as well. Sister Gomez is revealed as Cyclona's earliest abuser.

White Girl concludes that Sister Gomez is the witch-leader of a bizarre cult that molests and eats children and then sells child pornography videos, protected by the front of a Catholic mission. Ready to deliver justice, White Girl frees Cyclona and kills all the cult members; she also reveals Sister Gomez to be a trans woman. Since Sister Gomez is a cannibal, White Girl and Cyclona throw her in the oven. Burning, Sister Gomez screams of her 100,000 years of terror and the revenge from her father Jupiter that will ensue.

White Girl, keeping a promise made earlier, is forced to kill Cyclona rather than allow her to be captured. Cyclona, wishing to leave behind a life of abuse and violence, hopes to be reincarnated as an eagle. White Girl makes a deal with the Federales and leaves with her lawyer/pimp, stating, "I ain't hungry no more."

== Cast ==
- Natasha Lyonne as Crystal "White Girl" Van Meter
- María Celedonio as Angela "Cyclona" Garcia
- Vincent Gallo as Sister Gomez
- David Alan Grier as Mr. Butz
- Michael T. Weiss as Drifter
- John Landis as Judge
- Max Perlich as Flacco
- Bob Dawson as Detective Crefilo
- Jenn Griffin as Detective Dollar
- April Telek as Mrs. Wilson
- Richard Hendery as American Trick
- Alfonso Quijada as Federale
- Kendall Saunders as Blanca
- Nicole Parker Smith as Mousy
- Amber Warnat as 2nd White Girl
- Abel Urbina as Mexican Trick

== Release ==
The film premiered in the "Midnight Madness" category at the 1999 Toronto International Film Festival. In the United States, it was released direct to video.

== Reception ==
On Rotten Tomatoes, the film has an approval rating of 36% based on 11 reviews.

The A.V. Club describes it as "a sketchy but eerily effective take on Hansel and Gretel, with the ever-eccentric Gallo making a profound impact as a creepily soothing, androgynous charlatan with sinister intentions." In Variety, Dennis Harvey opines "Lacking the inspired performances as well as wit, suspense, energy and crisp storyline of the first film, it trades in a strained sensationalism that soon waxes surprisingly dull."
