= Matthew Bright =

American film director

- Born: June 8, 1952 (age 74); United States
- Other name: Toshiro Boloney
- Occupations: Film director, producer, writer, actor
- Years active: 1978–2003

Matthew Bright (born June 8, 1952) is a film director, producer, writer and actor.

His first credits were as writer and actor in Richard Elfman's 1980 film Forbidden Zone, portraying the twins Squeezit and René Henderson. The film includes his two sado-masochistic characters living in a garbage can, spit on, raped and tortured in an alternate dimension's kingdom and decapitated by Satan (played by Bright's real-life friend, composer Danny Elfman).

Bright wrote and directed the 1996 exploitation film Freeway and its 1999 direct-to-video sequel, Freeway II: Confessions of a Trickbaby with Natasha Lyonne in the lead.

Bright collaborated with Richard Elfman again, twice in the 1990s, writing the screenplays for Elfman's 1994 Charles Band-produced film Shrunken Heads, and his 1998 dark-comedy horror film Modern Vampires.

Bright's next film, Tiptoes, debuted in a 150-minute director's cut at Harry Knowles' Butt-Numb-A-Thon film festival. At the 2004 Sundance Film Festival, where the 90-minute version screened, Bright criticized the film and lambasted the producers for re-editing his film, leading them to drag him off stage. Subsequently, Bright would later say the film's failure hurt his career. The film went on to receive negative reviews, with some calling it one of the worst movies ever made.

In 2025, it was announced Bright was set to direct Spring Breakers: Salvation Mountain, a sequel to the 2012 film. Marking his first film in 22 years. In 2026, Bella Thorne, one of the stars of the film revealed the producers had since offered her the opportunity to write and direct the film after seeing an early cut of her directorial debut, Color Your Hurt.

== Filmography ==
| Year | Title | Director | Writer |
|---|---|---|---|
| 1980 | Forbidden Zone | No | Yes |
| 1988 | Wildfire | No | Yes |
| 1992 | Guncrazy | No | Yes |
| 1994 | Dark Angel: The Ascent | No | Yes |
| 1994 | Shrunken Heads | No | Yes |
| 1996 | Freeway | Yes | Yes |
| 1998 | Modern Vampires | No | Yes |
| 1999 | Freeway II: Confessions of a Trickbaby | Yes | Yes |
| 2002 | Ted Bundy | Yes | Yes |
| 2002 | Schwaz | Yes | Yes |
| 2003 | Tiptoes | Yes | Yes |
