= Witches (2024 film) =

British documentary film by Elizabeth Sankey

- Release poster
- Directed by: Elizabeth Sankey
- Written by: Elizabeth Sankey
- Produced by: Jeremy Warmsley; Manon Ardisson; Maria Chiara Ventura
- Distributed by: MUBI
- Release date: 22 November 2024
- Running time: 90 minutes
- Country: United Kingdom
- Language: English

Witches is a 2024 British documentary film written and directed by Elizabeth Sankey and produced by Jeremy Warmsley, Manon Ardisson, and Maria Chiara Ventura.

== Synopsis ==
Filtered through Sankey's own experience with post-partum anxiety, depression, and psychosis, the film attempts to connect women's mental health conditions with accusations of witchcraft throughout history. It includes interviews with Sankey's friends who have had similar experiences, alongside clips from films featuring witches and mentally ill women.

=== List of titles used in Witches ===
- Häxan (1922)
- The Passion of Joan of Arc (1928)
- The Wizard of Oz (1939)
- I Married a Witch (1942)
- Day of Wrath (1943)
- Jane Eyre (1943)
- Black Sunday (1960)
- Bewitched (1964–1972, TV series)
- The Witches (1966)
- Rosemary's Baby (1968)
- Witchfinder General (1968)
- Cry of the Banshee (1970)
- Legend of the Witches (1970)
- The Devils (1971)
- Macbeth (1971)
- The House That Dripped Blood (1971)
- Asylum (1972)
- House (1977)
- The Wiz (1978)
- Inferno (1980)
- Return to Oz (1985)
- The Witches of Eastwick (1987)
- Elvira: Mistress of the Dark (1988)
- Spellbinder (1988)
- Witchery (1988)
- An Angel at My Table (1990)
- The Juniper Tree (1990)
- The Witches (1990)
- Hocus Pocus (1993)
- The Craft (1996)
- The Crucible (1996)
- Practical Magic (1998)
- Girl, Interrupted (1999)
- Sleepy Hollow (1999)
- Gothika (2003)
- Changeling (2008)
- Macbeth the Movie (2009)
- The Ward (2010)
- Beautiful Creatures (2013)
- Hungry Hearts (2014)
- The Witch (2015)
- The Love Witch (2016)
- Hagazussa: A Heathen's Curse (2017)
- Tully (2017)
- Unsane (2018)
- Gretel & Hansel (2020)
- Kindred (2020)
- The Tragedy of Macbeth (2021)

== Reviews ==
Leslie Felperin of The Guardian called the film a "Kafkaesque echo chamber of paranoia and patriarchal oppression", "a powerful example of a bricolage-like editing technique that relies heavily on exploiting the copyright laws around fair use to create a prismatic, provocative style of cinema that's very 21st century". Natalia Keogan wrote in Filmmaker magazine that Sankey's on-screen testimonies provide an intelligent narration throughout the film from a unique personal perspective. The real-life personal account of postpartum psychosis was also praised by Catherine Wheatley in Sight and Sound.

== Accolades ==
Witches won Best Independent Documentary at the 2024 British Independent Film Awards. It won Best Single Documentary – Domestic at the 2025 Grierson Awards.

== Release ==
The film was released on MUBI in November 2024.
