= James Goldston =

British-American journalist

- Born: 19 June 1968 (age 58); Heston, London, England
- Citizenship: British; American
- Education: Cardiff School of Journalism (PgDip 1991); Jesus College, Oxford
- Occupations: Journalist; media executive; producer
- Years active: 1991–present
- Organization: Candle Media
- Known for: President of ABC News; Television news production Journalism
- Television: Tonight with Trevor McDonald; Living With Michael Jackson; Who Wants to Be a Millionaire: Major Fraud; 20/20; Nightline; Good Morning America
- Title: President, Candle True Stories; Former president, ABC News
- Term: 2014–2021
- Predecessor: Ben Sherwood
- Spouse: Laura Trevelyan (m. 1998)
- Children: 3
- Awards: See full list
- Website: candlemedia.com/candle-true-stories/

James Goldston (born 19 June 1968) is a British-American journalist, media executive, and former president of ABC News. In 2023, he joined Candle Media as head of its new nonfiction and documentary projects production studio.

== Early life ==
Goldston grew up in Heston, a suburb of Hounslow, West London. His mother Jill Goldston was a professional movie and TV extra. Anthony Ing a directed a 2022 short documentary about her career titled Jill, Uncredited. It was constructed from excerpted clips ranging from films including The Elephant Man and Mr. Bean. He recalls as a child being taken to a shooting for a James Bond film, in which he made an appearance.

== Early career ==
Goldston was the first in his family to go to university, where he studied philosophy, politics and economics at Jesus College, Oxford.

He then attended the Cardiff School of Journalism where he was trained by academics including British newspaper editor David English, graduating in 1991 with a PgDip Journalism qualification.

He began his career during work experience at the Richmond and Twickenham Times, followed by roles at The Surrey Herald and Legal Business.

== Broadcast journalism ==
His first job in broadcast journalism was at the BBC where he began on programmes including The Money Programme, Newsnight and Panorama. Goldston worked as an international correspondent for the BBC, and was responsible for reporting at the time of the end of The Troubles in Northern Ireland, during the start of the war in Kosovo, and on the Clinton Impeachment.

== Television production ==
In 1999 he moved to commercial broadcaster ITV and helped launch the flagship current affairs programme Tonight with Trevor McDonald. He became the programme's executive producer in 2002 and remained there until 2004. The show became "Britain’s most watched current affairs program."

Goldston secured significant interviews while at Tonight, including:

- Living With Michael Jackson in which the singer talked about sharing his bed with children. The report was picked up by ABC News in the United States and reached 27 million viewers. Host Martin Bashir went on to testify in Jackson's trial for alleged child molestation.
- Shock and Awe, live coverage anchored from Kuwait and Baghdad of the Iraq War.
- Who Wants to Be a Millionaire: Major Fraud, an investigation into Charles Ingram who in 2004 was convicted for cheating the popular UK game show. The Millionaire scandal was in 2020 picked up by ITV to become a major drama serial entitled Quiz.

Tonight received three Royal Television Society awards in five years during Goldston's tenure.

== ABC News career ==
=== 20/20 (2004–2005) ===
Goldston departed ITV and moved to the US in 2004 to become a Senior Producer at ABC News in New York, at the time accompanied by his friend and fellow contributor at ITV Bashir, with whom he worked on 20/20. In November 2005 the duo broadcast a report into the BALCO scandal, obtaining a rare interview with the company's founder Victor Conte who had been indicted by a federal grand jury in February 2004. Conte was charged with supplying drugs to 27 high-profile athletes including Barry Bonds and Marion Jones. The investigation led to the charging of Dwain Chambers, Tim Montgomery, and a number of other high-profile American Olympians.

=== Nightline (2005–2011) ===
In 2005, Goldston became the first British executive producer of prime time broadcast Nightline under its then host Ted Koppel. The broadcast was "on the verge of cancellation" and courting David Letterman as a potential new host when Goldston took over. He reformed the programme by removing the "single-anchor, single-topic format" and brought in a three-person team of Bashir, Cynthia McFadden, and Terry Moran.

He reportedly faced initial criticism from supporters of Koppel within ABC who felt in replacing previous producer Tom Bettag, Goldston was dismantling the long running format of the programme, however the audience quickly gained traction, moving up 14% among 25- to 54-year-olds in the "demo", while competitor programmes like the Tonight Show With Jay Leno and the Late Show With David Letterman took a hit in the ratings.

=== Good Morning America (2011–2014) and SVP ===
In 2011, he took over Good Morning America, which at the time had spent years behind its arch rival Today. Within a year in the role, the broadcast overtook the NBC production to claim top spot among audiences. He became senior vice president (SVP) for content and development at ABC News in 2012.

=== President of ABC News (2014–2021) ===
In April 2014, Goldston became the President of ABC News, reaching the role after just ten years at the network. He replaced Ben Sherwood, who was promoted to a senior role within Disney. He was at that point one of two Britons in charge of the Big Three television networks in the US, alongside Deborah Turness who was until 2017 the President of NBC News. At the time he also formed a British executive duo at ABC, alongside ABC Entertainment president (and BBC alum) Paul Lee.

At the time of his appointment, Goldston was labelled as having "something of a Midas touch" in the press after taking each broadcast he led (Nightline, GMA, and This Week) to the top spot for viewership, and with GMA enjoying "its best performance in 20 years."

In 2015, he travelled to the Vatican to lead on the network's interview with Pope Francis, which was anchored by David Muir.

In 2016, a letter was written to Goldston by journalists who were requesting reforms to improve the treatment of black candidates in hiring decisions. HuffPost sources described that Senior Vice President for Talent and Business at ABC Barbara Fedida intervened to join a meeting on the topic, a meeting which the group went on to describe as "tense". Mara Schiavocampo later accused Fedida of "racial discrimination", but later agreed a financial settlement including "a nondisclosure and nondisparagement agreement." In June 2020 Goldston placed Fedida, who first joined the company in 1989, on "administrative leave" after a HuffPost report which alleged an "extensive history" of "insensitive and racist remarks." In response to her suspension Fedida released a statement through her attorney describing the accusations as "heartbreaking and incredibly misleading." She was fired on 21 July 2020.

On January 28, 2021, Goldston in an internal memo, announced that he was stepping down from his post at ABC News at the end of March. The Los Angeles Times' Stephan Battaglio reported that the announcement of Goldston's exit came six months after the ouster of Barbara Fedida. Goldston himself had been rumored to have been on his way out since Fedida officially parted ways with ABC in July 2020.

== Adviser to Jan. 6 Committee ==
In 2022, Goldston worked with the United States House Select Committee on the January 6 Attack as an "unannounced adviser", assisting with their televised public hearings. Goldston assisted the Committee in crafting their public hearings so as to appeal to Americans who were not necessarily following the details of the probe into the January 6 attack.

== Awards ==
=== Personal ===
- Radio Television Digital News Association (2019) First Amendment Service Award

=== Network ===
- Edward R. Murrow Award (2016) for Overall Excellence in Television, and Series – TV (for Nightline).
- Edward R. Murrow Award (2015) for Overall Excellence in Television
- Edward R. Murrow Award (2014) for Overall Excellence in Television
- Emmy Award (2012) for Outstanding Business and Economic Reporting (ABC News/Center for Public Integrity)
- Emmy Award (2009) for Outstanding Investigative Journalism in a News Magazine
- Emmy Award (2007) for Outstanding Investigative Journalism in a Regularly Scheduled Newscast
- Peabody Award (2006) for Nightline
- Royal Television Society Awards (2004) for Program of the Year (ITV News)
- Royal Television Society Awards (2002) for Program of the Year (ITV News)
- Royal Television Society Awards (1993) for Program of the Year (ITV News)

== Personal life ==
Goldston resides in Brooklyn Heights, New York, with his wife Laura and three children. He met his wife, who was the anchor of BBC World News America, while studying journalism at Cardiff.

He is a supporter of Premier League side Chelsea F.C.
