= The Fourth Dimension (film) =

- Directed by: Harmony Korine; Aleksei Fedorchenko; Jan Kwiecinski
- Produced by: Eddy Moretti
- Starring: Val Kilmer; Rachel Korine; Darya Ekamasova
- Cinematography: Christopher Blauvelt
- Music by: Val Kilmer; Nick Zinner; Smyslovye Gallyutsinatsii
- Production company: VICE Media
- Release date: April 24, 2012 (Tribeca Film Festival)
- Running time: 105 min
- Countries: United States, Russia, Poland
- Languages: English, Russian

The Fourth Dimension is a 2012 independent film composed of three segments all created by different directors. In 2013, Vice Films worked with Grolsch Films Works to produce the film, which starred Val Kilmer and Rachel Korine.

== Segment synopsis ==
VICE's Eddy Moretti asked directors Harmony Korine (US), Aleksei Fedorchenko (Russia), and Jan Kwiecinski (Poland) to create the 30-minute segments, shooting in their native countries while exploring the idea of a "fourth dimension". The Fourth Dimension is a collection of three standalone short films about parallel universes:

- Harmony Korine – "Lotus Community Workshop"
- Aleksey Fedorchenko – "Chronoeye"
- Jan Kwiecinski – "Fawns"

Kilmer starred in Harmony Korine's short "The Lotus Community Workshop". He plays a version of himself from an alternate reality, a former actor-turned-self-help guru.

== Characters ==
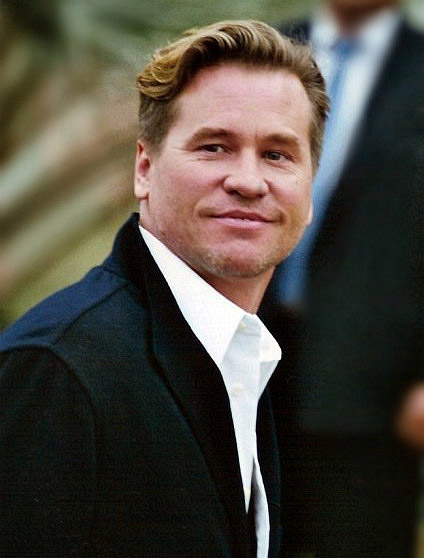
American actor Val Kilmer (pictured 2005) played the lead.

- Val Kilmer as himself
- Rachel Korine as Rach
- Darya Ekamasova as Valya

== Production ==
It was produced by VICE Films in collaboration with Grolsch Film Works, a new division of the namesake beer company. Kilmer notes that his addition to the list of actors that mock their real-life persona in fictional movies, including John Malkovich (Being John Malkovich) and Al Pacino (Jack and Jill), was an accident and says, "I still love saying the premise because it makes me laugh every time."
