= Jill Goldston =

English actress (born 1943)

Jill Goldston (born 1943) is the most prolific film and television extra in those media histories, having made 1,951 appearances between 1960 and 2009, a feat which has gained her a place in the Guinness World Records.

== Life and career ==
Born as Jillian Harris in 1943, Goldston was originally a student at the Royal Ballet School in England before running away aged 15 to join a revue company at Butlin's. She was a dancer at Murray's Cabaret Club with Mandy Rice-Davies at the height of the Profumo affair. During her long and prolific career, Goldston has featured in films, television productions and advertisements. These include Carry On Cleo (1964), Casino Royale (1967), The Virgin Soldiers (1969), The Elephant Man (1980), Chariots of Fire 1981), Santa Claus: The Movie (1985), The Lion, the Witch and the Wardrobe (1988) and Mr. Bean (1990). While appearing in Reds in 1981 she turned down the offer of a threesome with Warren Beatty and Jack Nicholson.

== Legacy ==
She is the subject of Jill, Uncredited (2022), a British-Canadian experimental documentary short film by video essayist Anthony Ing.

== Personal life ==
She is the mother of the former Washington D.C.–based president of ABC News James Goldston. Her husband Geoffrey Goldston (1940-), whom she met at Butlin's and married in 1963 in Marylebone, owns and manages a computer software company.
