= Rachel Korine =

American actress and artist

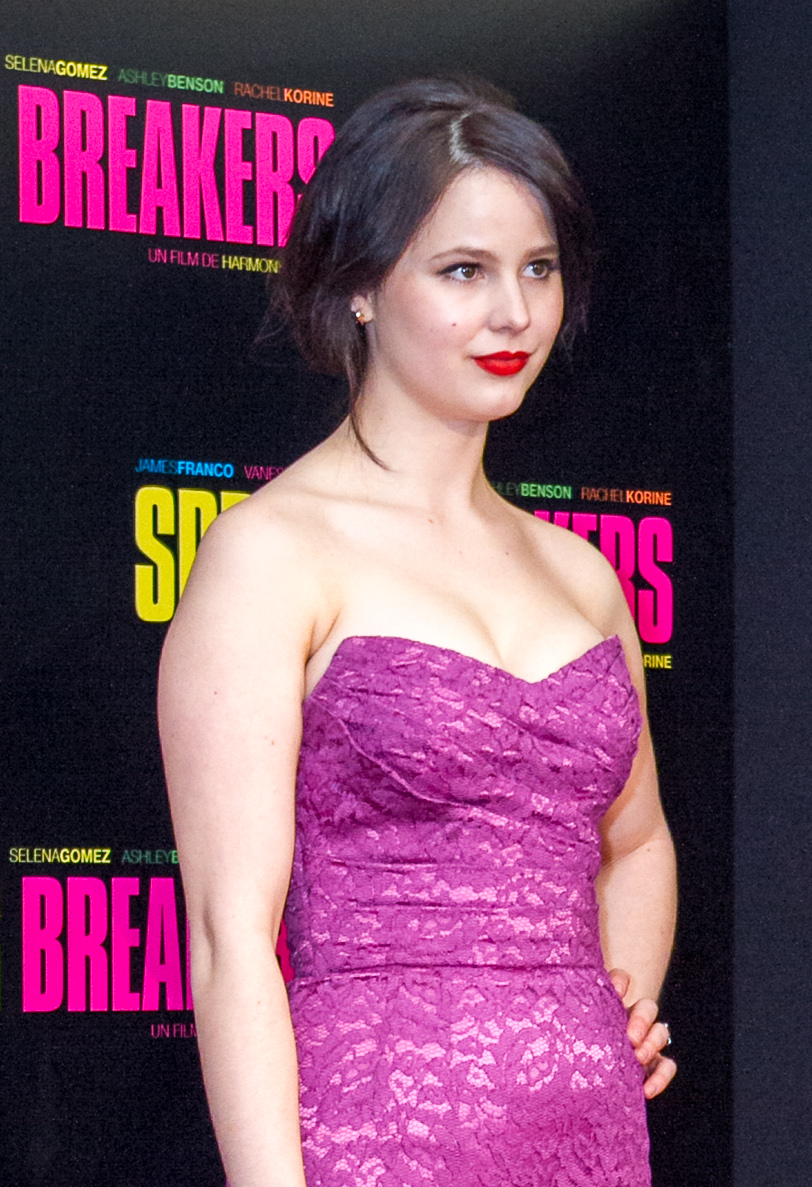
- Korine at the Paris premiere of Spring Breakers in 2013
- Born: Nashville, Tennessee, U.S.
- Occupations: Actress; artist
- Years active: 2007–2015
- Notable work: Spring Breakers
- Spouse: Harmony Korine (m. 2007, divorced)
- Children: 3

Rachel Anna Simon (formerly Korine) is an American former actress and artist. Formerly married to director Harmony Korine, she is best known for starring as Cotty in his 2013 crime film Spring Breakers as well as Betsy in Men Go to Battle (2015), and Junia in The Knick (2014–2015).

== Life and career ==
Korine was born and raised in Nashville, Tennessee. She has starred in the films Septien, Mister Lonely, Trash Humpers, and Spring Breakers, the latter three of which are written and directed by her former husband, Harmony Korine. From 2014–2015, she played Junia on the Cinemax drama series The Knick. As an artist, she had an exhibit titled You & Me in 2025.

== Personal life ==
Rachel and Harmony Korine met in their hometown of Nashville, and wed in 2007. They share a daughter and two sons. A 2025 Interview article reported that they were no longer married.

== Filmography ==
=== Film ===
Year	Title	Role	Notes
2007	Mister Lonely	Little Red Riding Hood	
2009	The Dirty Ones		Short film
2009	Trash Humpers	Momma	
2010	Mac and Plak	Momma	Short film
2010	42 One Dream Rush		Short film
2011	Septien	Savannah	
2012	The Fourth Dimension	Rach	Segment: "The Lotus Community Workshop"
2012	Spring Breakers	Cotty	
2014	Druid Peak	Zoe	
2015	Men Go to Battle	Betsy Small	

=== Television ===
Year	Title	Role	Notes
2014–2015	The Knick	Junia	Recurring role; 8 episodes
