= Personal Truth =

2017 British film

Personal Truth is a 2017 British film essay by Charlie Shackleton.

== Summary ==
A video diary of the filmmaker's closer look at the Pizzagate conspiracy theory, his sympathy with perpetrator Maddison Welch (himself an aspiring filmmaker at one point in his life), his former belief of the Elm Guest House rumors and the power of fake news.

== See also ==
- Alt-right
- Confirmation bias
