= Copycat (2015 film) =

- Directed by: Charlie Shackleton
- Release date: 2015
- Country: United States
- Language: English

Copycat is a 2015 documentary short film by Charlie Shackleton.

== Summary ==
1989: 19 year-old filmmaker Rolfe Kanefsky gathered $100,000 to make There's Nothing Out There, an early example of a meta-horror film. A decade later, it tanked at the box office despite critical acclaim. Rolfe later gave a copy of the film to Jonathan Craven, a young executive who is also the son of famed film director Wes Craven (who would later create the box office hit Scream, which is eerily similar to There's Nothing Out There).

== See also ==
- Postmodernist film
- Rodney King riots - one of the reasons why the film tanked according to Kanefsky
- Vulgar auteurism
