= Chris Hanley =

American film producer

Chris Hanley is an American film producer best known for producing independent films such as Buffalo '66, The Virgin Suicides, American Psycho, Bully, Spun, Spring Breakers, and London Fields.

== Early life ==
Chris Hanley was raised in Montclair, New Jersey, demonstrating an interest in art and photography. Hanley studied literature and philosophy at Amherst College in Western Massachusetts. Additionally, he studied at Columbia University and Oxford. Hanley met his wife Roberta at the affiliated Hampshire College's electronic music lab.

== Career ==
=== Music ===
Hanley started his career in the music business as the founder of Intergalactic Music, Inc., a company that supplied vintage Fender and Gibson guitars to musicians such as John McLaughlin, Heart, and John Entwistle of The Who. In the early 1980s, Intergalactic opened a recording studio in New York City, and recorded artists such as Afrika Bambaataa, Soul Sonic Force, Lisa Lisa and the Cult Jam, The Ramones, Chuck Hammer, and Blondie minus Debbie Harry.

In 1984, Hanley launched Rock Video International, the first company to license MTV videos for distribution in Japan and the first to bring music videos to the Eastern Bloc countries, the then-U.S.S.R. and Hungary. Rock Videos International expanded its licensing and was the first to bring the video disk jukebox to Japan, and later, the first to bring Japan's "karaoke" to the United States and the rest of the world.

=== Art ===
In 1987, Hanley formed Art Associates, Inc., to deal works by Andy Warhol and other "pop" artists such as Roy Lichtenstein, Jasper Johns, Robert Rauschenberg and Ed Ruscha, as well as minimalists Donald Judd, Sol LeWitt, Richard Serra and Richard Artschwager. By 1990, Art Associates was known internationally for its representation of contemporary artists such as Jean-Michel Basquiat, Julian Schnabel, Bickerton, Anselm Kiefer, Richard Prince, Andres Serrano and Damien Hirst.

== Film ==
In 1991, Hanley and his wife Roberta founded Muse Productions, Inc. to develop and produce feature films.

Their first film was Split Second, starring Rutger Hauer, Pete Postlethwaite, Kim Cattrall, Michael J. Pollard and Ian Dury. After this first project, they went on to produce Steve Buscemi's Trees Lounge, Freeway, and Buffalo '66.

In 1999, Muse produced The Virgin Suicides, Sofia Coppola's directorial debut, based on the novel by Jeffrey Eugenides. In 2000, Muse produced American Psycho, based on the novel by Bret Easton Ellis, directed by Mary Harron. Christian Bale's performance in the film received critical acclaim, boosting his career.

One of Hanley's latest productions, Harmony Korine's Spring Breakers, received positive reviews.
