= Fear Itself (film) =

- Festival poster
- Directed by: Charlie Lyne
- Produced by: Anthony Ing; Catherine Bray; Charlie Lyne; Daniel O'Connor
- Edited by: Charlie Lyne
- Music by: Jeremy Warmsley
- Release date: 18 October 2015 (iPlayer)
- Running time: 88 minutes
- Country: United Kingdom
- Language: English

Fear Itself is a 2015 British documentary film about horror cinema, directed by Charlie Lyne and narrated by Amy E. Watson.

== Summary ==
The film is constructed entirely from existing films with the exception of its opening and closing sequences.

== Release ==
The film debuted on the BBC iPlayer service in October 2015, becoming the second film to be released on the platform after Bitter Lake. Its festival premiere took place at International Film Festival Rotterdam in January 2016.

== Films featured ==
- 4 mosche di velluto grigio (1971)
- 8mm (1999)
- Alive (1993)
- Altered States (1980)
- Amber Alert (2012)
- Amityville II: The Possession (1982)
- Antichrist (2009)
- The Birds (1963)
- Blow Out (1981)
- Brazil (1985)
- Carnival of Souls (1962)
- La casa dalle finestre che ridono (1976)
- Christine (1983)
- Code inconnu (2000)
- Cure (1997)
- Dawn of the Dead (1978)
- The Dead Zone (1983)
- Der Todesking (1990)
- Don't Look Down (1998)
- Don't Look Now (1973)
- Elephant (1989)
- Elephant (2003)
- Enduring Love (2004)
- El espíritu de la colmena (1973)
- Et mourir de plaisir (1960)
- The Exorcist (1973)
- The Exorcist III (1990)
- Frankenstein (1931)
- Gravity (2013)
- Hollow Man (2000)
- Honogurai mizu no soko kara (2002)
- House of Dracula (1945)
- The Hunchback of Notre Dame (1923)
- It (1990)
- It Follows (2014)
- Jaws (1975)
- Ju-rei: Gekijôban – Kuro-ju-rei (2004)
- Kyôfu kikei ningen (1969)
- The Leopard Man (1943)
- Let's Scare Jessica to Death (1971)
- Logan's Run (1976)
- Lost Highway (1997)
- M (1931)
- The Man Who Haunted Himself (1970)
- Mahal (1949)
- Martyrs (2008)
- Midnight Lace (1960)
- Môjû (1969)
- Mulholland Drive (2001)
- Night of the Demon (1957)
- The Night of the Hunter (1955)
- A Nightmare on Elm Street 4: The Dream Master (1988)
- Nineteen Eighty-Four (1984)
- No profanar el sueño de los muertos (1975)
- Nosferatu, eine Symphonie des Grauens (1922)
- Nosferatu: Phantom der Nacht (1979)
- Outrage (1950)
- Parents (1989)
- Patrick (1978)
- Peeping Tom (1960)
- Pig (1998)
- Poltergeist (1982)
- Poltergeist II: The Other Side (1986)
- Poltergeist III (1988)
- Post Tenebras Lux (2012)
- Psycho (1960)
- Raat (1992)
- Repulsion (1965)
- Ring (1998)
- Scanners (1981)
- Sette note in nero (1977)
- Somos lo que hay (2010)
- Suspiria (1977)
- The Strangers (2007)
- Tetsuo: The Iron Man (1989)
- Twilight Zone: The Movie (1983)
- Uwakizuma: Chijokuzeme (1992)
- Uzumaki (2000)
- Videodrome (1983)
- Village of the Damned (1960)
- Die Zärtlichkeit der Wölfe (1973)
