= Beyond Clueless =

2014 film by Charlie Shackleton

- Theatrical release poster
- Directed by: Charlie Shackleton
- Produced by: Anthony Ing; Billy Boyd Cape; Charlie Shackleton; Catherine Bray
- Edited by: Charlie Shackleton
- Music by: Summer Camp
- Release dates: 10 March 2014 (SXSW); 23 January 2015 (UK); 29 April 2015 (France)
- Running time: 89 minutes
- Country: United Kingdom
- Language: English

Beyond Clueless is a 2014 British documentary film about teen movies, directed by Charlie Shackleton, narrated by Fairuza Balk and with an original soundtrack by Summer Camp.

== Summary ==
The film features extracts from over 200 teen movies, with a particular emphasis on those released between 1995 and 2004.

== Production ==
The film was funded on Kickstarter in January 2013 and edited in Shackleton's bedroom. It premiered at SXSW 2014 and went on to play at film festivals including International Film Festival Rotterdam, CPH:DOX and Hot Docs.

The title cards were designed by British artist Hattie Stewart.

== Films featured ==
- 10 Things I Hate About You (1999)
- 13 Going on 30 (2004)
- 40 Days and 40 Nights (2002)
- 100 Girls (2000)
- Aardvark (2002)
- A Cinderella Story (2004)
- All I Wanna Do (1998)
- Alpha Dog (2006)
- American Beauty (1999)
- American Girl (2002)
- American History X (1998)
- American Pie (1999)
- American Pie 2 (2001)
- American Pie Presents: Band Camp (2005)
- American Pie Presents: The Naked Mile (2006)
- American Psycho 2 (2002)
- American Virgin (2000)
- Animal Room (1995)
- Another Day in Paradise (1998)
- Antitrust (2001)
- Apt Pupil (1998)
- Bang Bang You're Dead (2002)
- The Basketball Diaries (1995)
- The Believer (2001)
- The Blair Witch Project (1999)
- Blue Crush (2002)
- Book of Shadows: Blair Witch 2 (2000)
- The Book of Stars (1999)
- Borstal Boy (2000)
- Boys (1996)
- Boys and Girls (2000)
- Boys Don't Cry (1999)
- Bring It On (2000)
- Bring It On Again (2004)
- Bringing Rain (2003)
- Bubble Boy (2001)
- Bully (2001)
- But I'm a Cheerleader (1999)
- Cabin Fever (2002)
- Can't Hardly Wait (1998)
- Cherry Falls (2000)
- Clockstoppers (2002)
- Clueless (1995)
- Confessions of a Teenage Drama Queen (2004)
- The Craft (1996)
- Crazy/Beautiful (2001)
- Crime and Punishment in Suburbia (2000)
- Crossroads (2002)
- Cruel Intentions (1999)
- Cruel Intentions 2 (2001)
- Cruel Intentions 3 (2004)
- The Crush (1993)
- The Curve (1998)
- The Dangerous Lives of Altar Boys (2002)
- Dear Wendy (2004)
- Dirty Girls (2000)
- Disturbing Behavior (1998)
- Don's Plum (2001)
- Donnie Darko (2001)
- The Doom Generation (1995)
- Down to You (2000)
- The Dreamers (2003)
- Drive Me Crazy (1999)
- Election (1999)
- Elephant (2003)
- Empire Records (1995)
- EuroTrip (2004)
- Excess Baggage (1997)
- The Faculty (1998)
- Fear (1996)
- Final Destination (2000)
- Frat House (1998)
- Freaky Friday (2003)
- Freeway (1996)
- Freeway II: Confessions of a Trickbaby (1999)
- Get Over It (2001)
- Ghost World (2001)
- Ginger Snaps (2000)
- Ginger Snaps 2: Unleashed (2004)
- Girl (1998)
- The Girl Next Door (2004)
- The Glass House (2001)
- Good Burger (1997)
- Good Will Hunting (1997)
- Gossip (2000)
- Gummo (1997)
- Hackers (1995)
- Halloween H20: 20 Years Later (1998)
- Halloween: The Curse of Michael Myers (1995)
- Happy Campers (2001)
- Here on Earth (2000)
- Highway (2002)
- Home Room (2002)
- House of Wax (2005)
- How to Deal (2003)
- Human Traffic (1999)
- I Know What You Did Last Summer (1997)
- I Love You, I Love You Not (1996)
- I Still Know What You Did Last Summer (1998)
- Idle Hands (1999)
- Imaginary Crimes (1994)
- The In Crowd (2000)
- It's a Boy Girl Thing (2006)
- Jawbreaker (1999)
- Jeepers Creepers (2001)
- Jeepers Creepers II (2003)
- John Tucker Must Die (2006)
- Josie and the Pussycats (2001)
- Joy Ride (2001)
- Ken Park (2002)
- Kids (1995)
- L.I.E. (2001)
- The Laramie Project (2002)
- Loser (2000)
- Love Don't Cost a Thing (2003)
- Masterminds (1997)
- Mean Creek (2004)
- Mean Girls (2004)
- Murder by Numbers (2002)
- Mysterious Skin (2004)
- Napoleon Dynamite (2004)
- Never Been Kissed (1999)
- New Best Friend (2002)
- Not Another Teen Movie (2001)
- Nowhere (1997)
- O (2001)
- The Opposite of Sex (1998)
- Orange County (2002)
- Paradise Lost 2: Revelations (2000)
- Pleasantville (1998)
- The Princess Diaries (2001)
- Prozac Nation (2001)
- Pumpkin (2002)
- The Rage: Carrie 2 (1999)
- Road Trip (2000)
- Roger Dodger (2002)
- Romeo + Juliet (1996)
- The Rules of Attraction (2002)
- Rushmore (1998)
- Save the Last Dance (2001)
- Saved! (2004)
- Scary Movie (2000)
- Scooby-Doo (2002)
- Scream (1996)
- S.F.W. (1994)
- Slap Her, She's French! (2002)
- She's All That (1999)
- She's the Man (2006)
- The Skulls (2000)
- Slackers (2002)
- SLC Punk! (1998)
- Slums of Beverly Hills (1998)
- Spider-Man (2002)
- Spun (2002)
- Storytelling (2001)
- SubUrbia (1996)
- Summer Catch (2001)
- Swimfan (2002)
- Tangled (2001)
- Tart (2001)
- Teaching Mrs. Tingle (1999)
- The Texas Chainsaw Massacre (2003)
- Texas Chainsaw Massacre: The Next Generation (1994)
- Thirteen (2003)
- Totally Fucked Up (1993)
- Twin Peaks: Fire Walk With Me (1992)
- The United States of Leland (2003)
- The Unsaid (2001)
- Urban Legend (1998)
- Urban Legends: Final Cut (2000)
- Valentine (2001)
- Van Wilder (2002)
- Van Wilder: The Rise of Taj (2006)
- Varsity Blues (1999)
- The Virgin Suicides (1999)
- Virtual Sexuality (1999)
- Wasted (2002)
- Whatever It Takes (2000)
- Wicked (1998)
- Wild Things (1998)
- Y Tu Mama Tambien (2001)
- Zero Day (2003)
