= Freeway (1996 film) =

1996 film by Matthew Bright

- Theatrical release poster
- Directed by: Matthew Bright
- Written by: Matthew Bright
- Produced by: Brad Wyman; Chris Hanley
- Starring: Kiefer Sutherland; Reese Witherspoon; Wolfgang Bodison; Dan Hedaya; Amanda Plummer; Brooke Shields; Michael T. Weiss; Bokeem Woodbine; Brittany Murphy
- Cinematography: John Thomas
- Edited by: Maysie Hoy
- Music by: Danny Elfman
- Production companies: The Kushner-Locke Company; Illusion Entertainment Group
- Distributed by: Republic Pictures
- Release dates: January 19, 1996 (Sundance); June 8, 1996 (HBO); August 23, 1996 (United States)
- Running time: 104 minutes
- Country: United States
- Language: English
- Budget: $3 million
- Box office: $295,493

Freeway is a 1996 American dark comedy crime thriller film written and directed by Matthew Bright, and produced by Oliver Stone. It stars Kiefer Sutherland and Reese Witherspoon. The film's plot is a dark take on the fairy tale "Little Red Riding Hood".

The film premiered at the 1996 Sundance Film Festival, where it competed for the Grand Jury Prize. It was later screened on HBO on June 8, 1996, and due to favorable reviews, it was given a limited theatrical release. The film has gone on to achieve cult status. A sequel, Freeway II: Confessions of a Trickbaby, was released in 1999.

== Plot ==
Vanessa Lutz is an illiterate 15-year-old living in an impoverished neighborhood in Southern California with her neglectful, drug-addicted mother, Ramona, and abusive stepfather, Larry. When Ramona is arrested in a prostitution sting and Larry on drug and child abuse charges, social worker Mrs. Sheets arrives to place Vanessa in foster care. Vanessa handcuffs her to a bed and runs away.

Taking her mother's rundown car, Vanessa sets out for Stockton to live with her estranged grandmother. Before leaving she visits her boyfriend, Chopper Wood, a gang member, who gives her his pistol to sell for money. Shortly afterward, Chopper is killed in a drive-by shooting. When her car breaks down along Interstate 5, Vanessa is stranded until Bob Wolverton, a child psychologist, offers her a ride up to Los Angeles.

During the drive, Bob manipulates Vanessa into trusting him. She confides in him about her troubled upbringing, including graphic details of sexual abuse by Larry and foster parents. After buying her dinner, Bob reveals himself as the serial killer known as the "I-5 Killer". He cuts off a lock of her hair as a keepsake and threatens to sexually assault and murder her. Vanessa fights back, drawing her pistol and holding him at gunpoint. She orders him to drive to a secluded location, where she shoots him several times and leaves him for dead. After stealing his money, Vanessa flees to a roadside diner, where her bloodstained appearance prompts the owners to call 911.

Vanessa is arrested and questioned by police detectives Mike Breer and Garnet Wallace, who dismiss her claims that Bob tried to kill her, citing her extensive juvenile criminal record and his respectable reputation. Bob survives, although his injuries leave him disabled and facially disfigured. At her arraignment, Vanessa refuses to express remorse and is ordered detained pending an evaluation to determine whether she should be tried as an adult. Meanwhile, Bob and his socialite wife Mimi, who is unaware of his crimes, receive sympathetic media coverage as victims of youth crime.

At a juvenile detention center, Vanessa befriends Rhonda, a heroin-addicted lesbian. After attacking Mesquita, a violent Hispanic gang leader, Vanessa is placed in solitary confinement, where she fashions a shiv from a toothbrush. During their transport to a maximum security prison, Vanessa and Mesquita reconcile and attack their guards with the shiv before escaping. Mesquita helps Vanessa obtain new clothes, a false identification card, and a firearm before they go their separate ways.

Breer begins reconsidering Vanessa's claims after interviewing her acquaintances and discovering a lock of her hair at the scene of the shooting. The detectives search Bob's home, finding child pornography and keepsakes taken from his victims in a locked storage shed. Horrified, Mimi commits suicide. Bob evades police and travels to Vanessa's grandmother's trailer, using the address written on a photograph Vanessa had shown him.

Posing as a prostitute, Vanessa robs a prospective client at gunpoint and steals his car to reach her grandmother's trailer. Upon arriving, she finds Bob disguised as her grandmother, whom he has sexually assaulted and murdered. Bob initially holds Vanessa at gunpoint, but she fights back and strangles him to death. Detectives Breer and Wallace arrive shortly afterward and discover the bodies. An exhausted Vanessa raises her hands in surrender, but the detectives begin laughing, prompting her to laugh as well. Sitting outside the trailer, she asks them for a cigarette.

== Cast ==
- Kiefer Sutherland as Robert "Bob" Wolverton
- Reese Witherspoon as Vanessa Lutz
- Wolfgang Bodison as Detective Mike Breer
- Dan Hedaya as Detective Garnet Wallace
- Amanda Plummer as Ramona Lutz
- Brooke Shields as Mimi Wolverton
- Michael T. Weiss as Larry
- Bokeem Woodbine as Chopper Wood
- Guillermo Díaz as Flacco
- Brittany Murphy as Rhonda
- Alanna Ubach as Mesquita
- Susan Barnes as Mrs. Cullins
- Conchata Ferrell as Mrs. Sheets
- Tara Subkoff as Sharon
- Julie Araskog as Prosecutor
- Paul Perri as Cop
- Lorna Raver as Judge
- Kitty Fox as Grandma

== Production ==
Oliver Stone served as one of the film's executive producers. Filming took place on location in Los Angeles from July 31 to August 28, 1995. Writer and director Matthew Bright stated the film underwent multiple edits during post-production and he was unable to preserve his original cut, as Stone was in Nepal at the time.

Due to the film's limited budget, prop cars were not readily available during production. According to Reese Witherspoon, a scene in which her character solicits passing motorists was filmed with unsuspecting drivers: "Cars are driving by and I'm flagging them down, screaming profanities at them, asking them if they want to have sex with me – they have no idea we're making a movie... People were just like totally taking me seriously. It was really scary."

== Release ==
=== Theatrical ===
Freeway premiered at the Sundance Film Festival on January 19, 1996, where it was nominated for the Grand Jury Prize.

=== Home media ===
Freeway was released on VHS by Republic Pictures Home Video on February 18, 1997, and on DVD on August 20, 1997. The film was released as a 4K limited edition Blu-ray by Vinegar Syndrome on November 25, 2022.

In Australia, Columbia TriStar Home Video submitted the original 104-minute version of the film on VHS to the Australian Classification Board, which refused classification. The board had previously approved a 102-minute version that omitted two scenes: one in which Bob crudely asks Vanessa to engage in anal sex, and another depicting Vanessa's deceased grandmother lying nude and bound, with her legs spread and a vase covering her genitalia. The censored version remains available on home video in Australia, where it is rated R18+.

== Reception ==
=== Critical response ===
On the review aggregator website Rotten Tomatoes, 76% of 42 critics' reviews are positive, with an average rating of 6.9/10. The website's consensus reads: "A modern update on the tale of Little Red Riding Hood, Freeway is an audacious black comedy with a star-making performance from the young Reese Witherspoon." Metacritic, which uses a weighted average, assigned the film a score of 61 out of 100, based on 15 critics, indicating "generally favorable" reviews.

Critics praised the film's hard-edged satire and performances. Film critic Roger Ebert gave Freeway three and a half stars out of four and stated, "Like it or hate it (or both), you have to admire its skill, and the over-the-top virtuosity of Reese Witherspoon and Kiefer Sutherland." It received "Two Thumbs Up" from Ebert and Gene Siskel on At the Movies. Joe Baltake of The Sacramento Bee gave Freeway four stars out of four and called it "a wild, audacious drive-in attraction that takes the 'high' from 'highbrow' and the 'low' from 'lowdown' and shakes them up". Mick LaSalle of the San Francisco Chronicle gave Freeway four stars out of four and said that it was "rude in the way the truth is rude—only funnier". Margaret A. McGurk wrote for The Cincinnati Enquirer that "I didn't particularly want to like Freeway, but I couldn't help myself. Reese Witherspoon made me."

The film was not a success at the box office but has achieved a cult following over the years through home video and HBO airings from fans who praise its satire, camp style, and Witherspoon's performance.

== Sequel ==
A sequel titled Freeway II: Confessions of a Trickbaby, also directed by Matthew Bright, was released in 1999. The original actors or characters did not appear in the sequel.

== See also ==
- Tarantinoesque film
