= Charlie Shackleton =

English filmmaker, artist and film critic (born 1991)

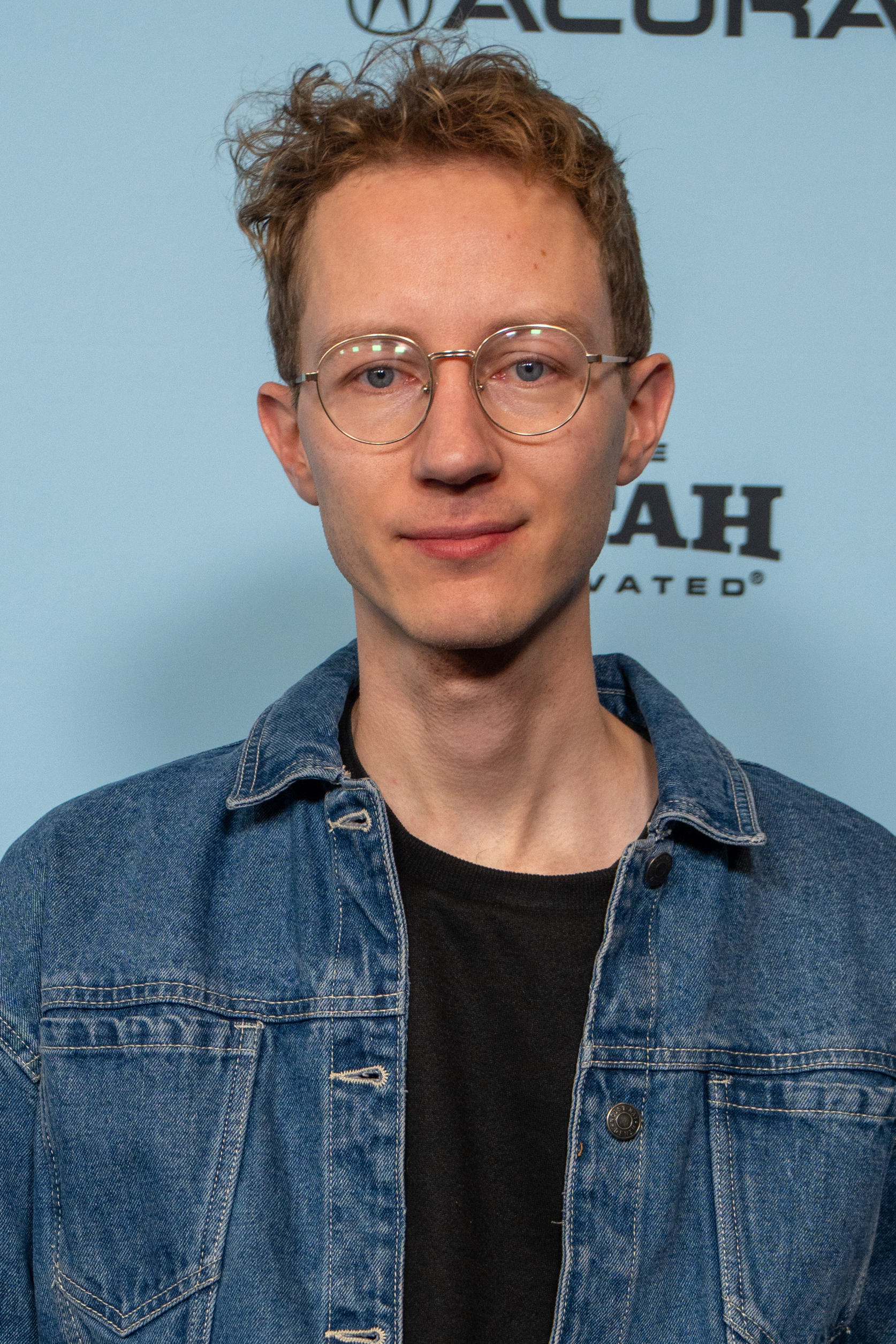
- Shackleton at the 2025 Sundance Film Festival
- Born: 15 August 1991 (age 35); London, England
- Occupations: Filmmaker; multimedia artist; film critic

Charlie Shackleton (formerly Charlie Lyne; born 15 August 1991) is an English filmmaker, multimedia artist, and film critic. He has made several films, including Beyond Clueless, Fear Itself, and the 2023 protest film Paint Drying, as well as the multimedia performance piece As Mine Exactly.

== Early life ==
Charlie Shackleton was born on 15 August 1991, at St Mary's Hospital in London, raised by his mother, Jane Shackleton. He details in his piece As Mine Exactly how their relationship evolved after she developed epilepsy when he was a child. At the time, Shackleton videotaped several of her seizures at the request of her medical team.

== Career ==
Shackleton established the movie blog Ultra Culture in 2008, at the age of 16. In 2010, Shackleton joined the BBC programme Film 2010, after being approached by host Claudia Winkleman on Twitter. Shackleton left the show after one season. He continues to write film criticism as a regular contributor to Sight & Sound.

His debut film Beyond Clueless premiered at SXSW in 2014. The film, an essayistic exploration of nineties teen movies narrated by Fairuza Balk, was crowdfunded through Kickstarter. His second, Fear Itself, debuted on the BBC iPlayer in October 2015. Like his debut, it utilised existing film footage and original narration, this time exploring the horror genre.

In 2016, Shackleton again took to Kickstarter to crowdfund Paint Drying, a 607-minute film of white paint drying on a brick wall to be submitted to the British Board of Film Classification in a protest against censorship and mandatory classification for films released in the UK. On 26 January 2016, Paint Drying was given a U rating for 'no material likely to offend or harm'. In 2018 he founded the production company LOOP with filmmakers Anthony Ing and Catherine Bray. The same year they offered three 'no-strings-attached' filmmaker grants of £5,000, which were awarded to Jamie Janković, Grace Lee, and John Ogunmuyiwa. Loop will not retain any copyright or ownership of the films.

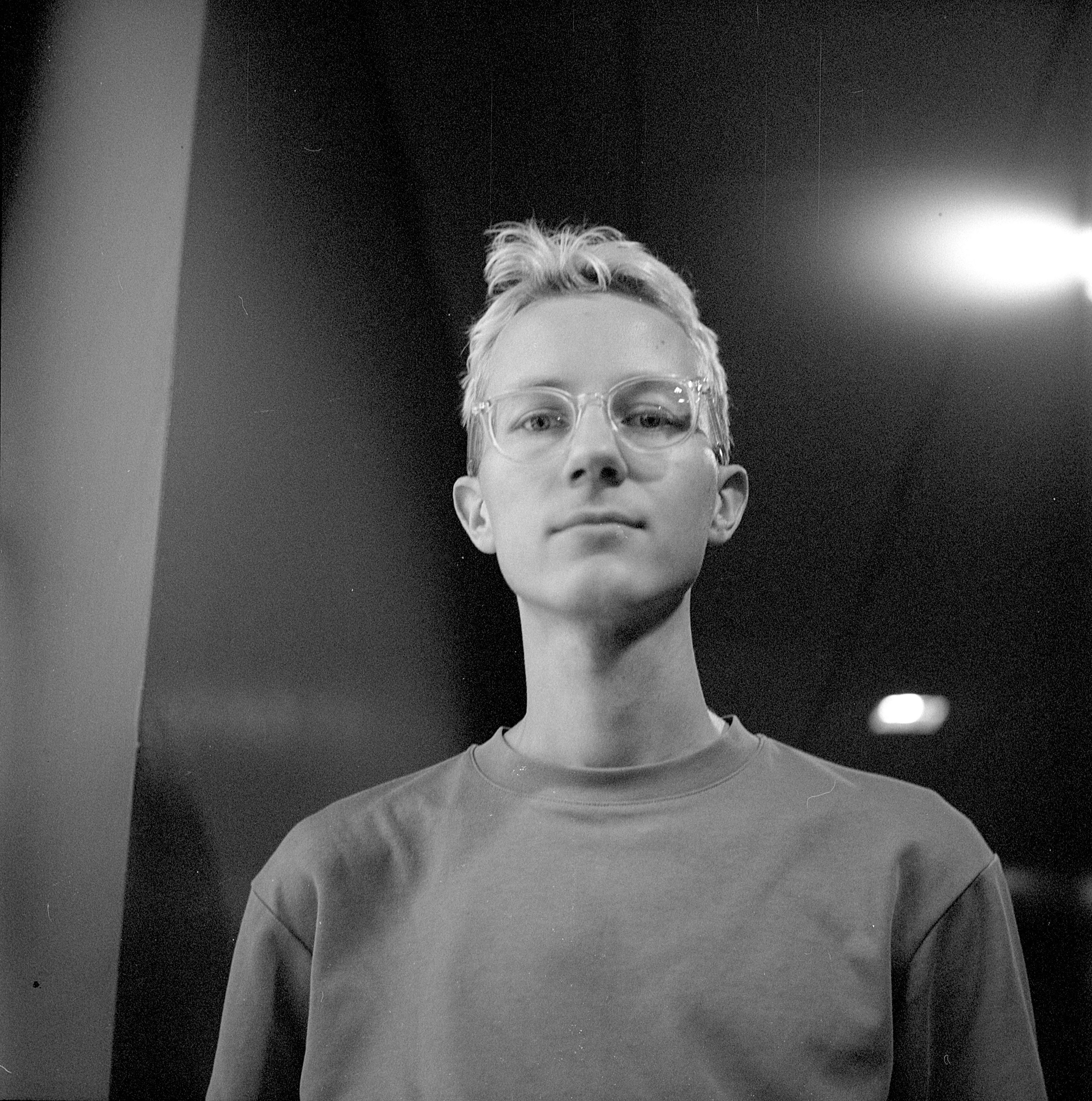
Shackleton in 2022

Through Loop, Shackleton continued to direct and produce features and shorts in the essay film format. His short documentaries Fish Story and Lasting Marks, published through The Guardian, focused on the family history of film critic Caspar Salmon and the British police's investigation into same-sex male sadomasochism in the 1980s, respectively. Lasting Marks was a co-production with documentarian Laura Poitras's company Field of Vision, and based on Shackleton's own archival research. He worked with Ross Sutherland on the essay film Stand By for Tape Back-Up, which used the degrading quality of VHS tapes to explore familial grief, and was a creative consultant on Kitty Green's The Assistant. In 2021 and 2022 respectively he began touring two new projects: The Afterlight, another essay film which exists as a single print which will degrade with each showing, and As Mine Exactly, a virtual reality performance piece about his mother's experiences with epilepsy. Both works can only be accessed in person; As Mine Exactly is performed one-on-one by Shackleton for each individual. As Mine Exactly was performed in Belfast; Denver; Columbus; New York City; London; Lewisburg, Pennsylvania; and Columbia, Missouri, for between 20 and 52 individuals in each city. The piece won the Immersive Art and XR Award at the 2022 London Film Festival.

Shackleton's feature-length documentary Zodiac Killer Project premiered at the 2025 Sundance Film Festival, where it won the NEXT Innovator Award.

== Personal life ==
Shackleton's father left the family when he was a baby and he was raised by his mother. In 2004, he began using his father's surname, Lyne, in what he later described as "a fit of teenage reinvention". In 2019, he reverted to using his mother's name, Shackleton.

== Works ==
=== Film ===
- Beyond Clueless (2014)
- Copycat (2015)
- Fear Itself (2015)
- Fish Story (2017)
- Personal Truth (2017)
- Lasting Marks (2018)
- A Machine For Viewing (2019)
- The Afterlight (2021)
- Paint Drying (2023)
- Zodiac Killer Project (2025)

=== Multimedia ===
- As Mine Exactly (2022)
