= List of programs broadcast by NBCSN =

This is a list of programs broadcast by the American television channel NBCSN, which includes its eras as the Outdoor Life Network (OLN) and Versus (VS.).

- 3-Gun Nation
- 36
- Aaron's Outdoors
- All of the Best Whitetail Tips
- American Drag Racing League
- American Ninja Warrior
- Americana Outdoors
- Ammo & Attitude
- AMSOIL Championship Snocross
- ARCA Racing Series Presented by Menards (2013)
- Armstrong
- Ask Bobke
- Atlanta Football Classic
- Babe Winkelman: Outdoor Secrets
- Babe Winkelman's Good Fishing
- Back County Quest
- Bass 2 Billfish
- The Bass Pros
- Behind the Bike with Austin Caroll
- Beretta's Bird Hunter's Journal
- Beretta's Waterfowler's Edge
- The Best and Worst of Tred Barta
- Big Bass Battle
- Bill Dance Outdoors
- Blue Collar Adventures
- Bob Izumi's Real Fishing
- Bob Redfern's Outdoor Magazine
- Bobke's Beef
- The Bucks of Tecomate
- Cabela's Master Walleye Circuit
- Camo Life
- Campbell Outdoor Challenge
- Charlie Moore: No Offense
- City Limits Fishing with Mike Iaconelli
- The Coaches Corner
- College Football Talk
- Collegiate Bass Championship
- Contador
- Costas Tonight
- Criterium de Dauphine
- Critérium International
- The Crossover
- Curling Night in America
- D U's WaterDog
- The Daily Line
- The Daily Line Interview
- Dakar Rally
- Danica's Decade
- The Dan Patrick Show
- Deer and Deer Hunting TV
- Deer Gear
- Dirt Knight
- /DRIVE
- Elk Fever
- Eye of the Hunter
- F1 Extra
- Fanarchy
- Fantasy Football Live
- Federal Premium Damage Game
- Fish the Baja
- Fishing with Roland Martin
- FLW Outdoors
- Fly Fish TV with Kelly Galloup
- Formula D
- Formula One (from 2013 to 2017, 16 races)
- George Poveromo's World of Saltwater Fishing
- Global Pursuit Safari
- Goin' Country with Kristy Lee Cook
- GP2 Series
- Great American Outdoor Trail's Radio Magazine
- Greatest MLB Rivalries
- Grid
- Gun It with Benny Spies
- Gun Talk
- Guns & Gear
- Hank Parker 3D
- Hank Parker's Outdoor Magazine
- Hook 'N Look with Kim Stricker
- Hunt For Big Fish
- Huntin' with the Judge
- Ice Men
- Indianapolis 500 - Carb Day
- Indy Lights
- Inside the Daily Line
- Inside Israeli Basketball
- InterBike 2010
- Into the Blue
- Intrepid Outdoors: Guns vs. Bows
- Jenny from the Blog
- Jimmy Houston Outdoors
- Kicker Big Air Bash
- La Flèche Wallonne
- The Lance Chronicles
- Liege Bastogne Liege
- The 'Lights
- Lindner's Angling Edge
- Lucas Oil Pro Motocross Championship
- Lucas Oil Motorsports Hour
- Majesty Outdoors
- MLS on NBC
- Match of the Day
- Mountain West Basketball
- Napa's North to Alaska
- NASCAR America
- NASCAR Whelen Modified Tour
- National Lacrosse League
- NBA on NBC
- NBA D-League
- NBC SportsTalk
- The Next Bite
- NHL Draft Lottery
- The NHL Guardians
- NHL on NBC
- Non-Stop Hunting
- North American Fisherman
- North American Hunter
- The Numbers Guys
- One More Cast with Shaw Grigsby
- O'Neill Outside
- OPA Offshore Racing Series
- Outdoor Edge's Love of the Hunt
- Pacific Expeditions
- Paris–Nice
- Paris Roubaix
- Poker2Nite
- Primal Adventures TV
- Pro Football Talk
- Quest for the One
- Racer TV
- Razor Dobbs Alive
- Real Hunting
- Remington's The Buck Stops Here with Mike Hanback
- The Rider Insider
- The Robin Hood Rally
- The Roadside Tour
- Ruger's Adventures
- Safari Hunter's Journal
- Saltwater Experience
- Saturday Night Live
- Scent Blocker Most Wanted
- Schleck
- Scott Martin Challenge
- Seasons on the Fly
- Sepang 1000 km
- Shark Hunters
- SHOT Show
- Sport Fishing TV
- Sports Hangover
- Sports Jeopardy!
- Sports Jobs with Junior Seau
- Sports Soup
- SportsDash with Yahoo Sports
- Steve Scott's Outdoor Guide
- Super Retriever Series
- The T. Ocho After Show
- The T. Ocho Show
- Testosterone Theater
- This Week in Indy Racing with Lindy Thackston
- Title Talk
- Tour de France
- Tour de Romandie
- Tour de Suisse
- Tour Down Under
- Tour of California
- Tour of Flanders
- U.S. Ski and Snowboarding Events
- UFC on Versus
- UFC Primetime
- Ultimate Diver Challenge
- Under Wild Skies
- United Football League
- USA Beach Volleyball
- USA Diving Nationals
- USA Judo
- USA Triathlon
- USA Waterpolo Exhibition Series
- Verizon IndyCar Series
- Versus Archive
- Viewers' Choice
- VS Whitetail Challenge
- Whacked Out Sports
- Wheel Sucking with Neil Browne
- Winchester Legends
- Winchester Turkey Revolution
- Winchester Whitetail Revolution
- Winchester World of Whitetail with Larry Weishuhn
- Winning with Johan
- World Bicycle Relief
- World Challenge
- World Chase Tag
- The World of Beretta
- World Series of Boxing
- World's Best 10K
- WTA Sony Ericsson
- XDL Sportbike Championship
- Yamaha Whitetail Diaries

== See also ==
- NBCSN
- NBC Sports
- OLN, current Canadian Outdoor Living Network
- List of programs broadcast by OLN
