= Cheating Vegas =

American documentary television series

- Genre: Documentary
- Presented by: Roy Samuelson
- No. of series: 1
- No. of episodes: 3

Production
- Running time: 44 minutes

Original release
- Network: Destination America
- Release: August 19 – September 3, 2012

Cheating Vegas is a documentary television series that originally aired on Destination America. The series is about the illegal industry of cheating in casinos, featuring interviews with several infamous cheaters and informative information, topped off with real security camera footage of cheaters in the act. The show also includes talks from Nevada Gaming Control Board members about the different cheaters involved.

== Plot ==
The show is a compilation of security camera footage, phone calls to prisoners known to cheat in Vegas, and talks with Nevada Gaming members. As casino employees have noticed, if there is money involved, there are unscrupulous people out there willing to grab it. Real security camera footage probably unseen anywhere else allows viewers to have a look at the daily cheaters' main job. Many forms of cheating are included, such as point shaving, rigging slot machines, and manipulating the game of craps.

Not addressed is the matter of casinos cheating patrons, although the Nevada Gaming Control Board certainly has such cases in its files.

== Episodes ==
No.	Title	Original release date
1	"Insiders"	August 19, 2012
Casino employees and other "insiders" commit gaming crimes.
2	"Game Changers"	August 26, 2012
Casino security must stay one step ahead of the "game changers," cheats who are constantly creating new scams.
3	"Hall of Fame"	September 3, 2012
The most brazen cheaters in Vegas including Dennis Nikrasch, an infamous slot cheater who reigned for 22 years.

== Reception ==
"It's a riveting look at the world of high-stakes deception and the cat-and-mouse game between the casinos and those who would fleece them. It's also a series that provides cautionary tale after cautionary tale for anyone out there who might be thinking of taking those fantasies of beating Vegas at its own game out for a spin in the real world." wrote Channel Guide.
