= Emlen Physick Estate =

Historical house and building- located in New Jersey, United States

Coordinates: 38.94028°N 74.91409°W

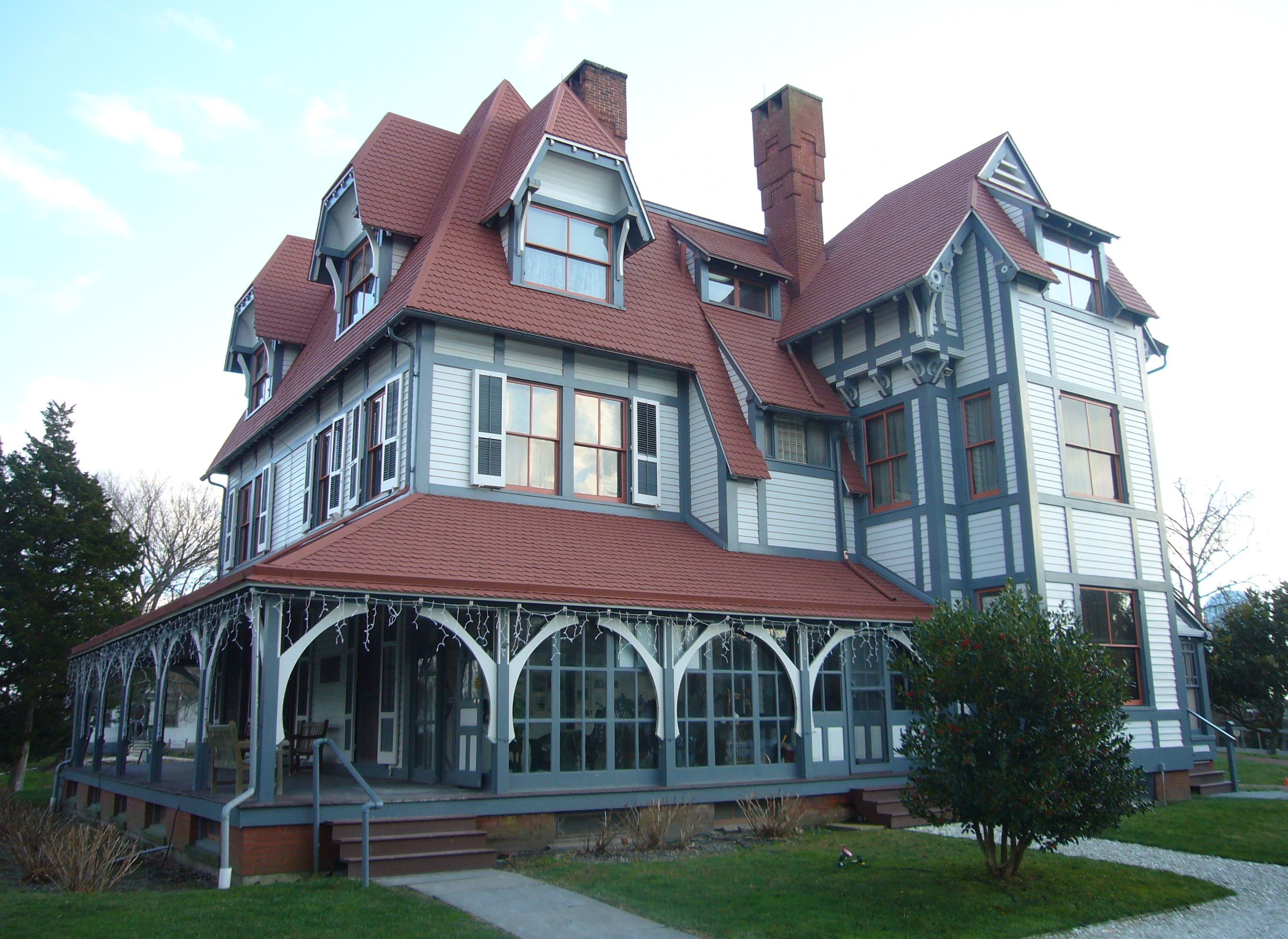
Emlen Physick Mansion

The Emlen Physick Estate is a Victorian house museum in Cape May, New Jersey. The estate is located at 1048 Washington Street.

== History ==
The 18-room mansion, designed by American architect Frank Furness, was built in 1879 for Dr. Emlen Physick Jr. (1855–1916), descendant of a well-known Philadelphia family, his widowed mother, Mrs. Ralston, and maiden Aunt Emilie. The mansion is closely related to Furness's Knowlton Mansion (1880–81) in Northeast Philadelphia.

== Architecture ==
The Physick Mansion is an example of "Stick style" architecture. Its exterior is distinguished by Furness's trademark oversized features, including gigantic upside-down corbelled chimneys, hooded "jerkin-head" dormers, and the huge stick-like brackets on the porch. Many original furnishings are on display throughout the house.

== Museum ==
The Mid-Atlantic Center for the Arts & Humanities (MAC) was formed in 1970 to save the Physick Estate from demolition. The city purchased the estate and MAC leases it from the city of Cape May. MAC has restored, maintains and operates the estate as a Victorian historic house museum and offers guided tours year-round. The four-acre estate also includes the Carriage House, which contains a ticket office, the Carroll Gallery and year-round exhibits, the Carriage House Museum Shop, the Carriage House Cafe & Tearoom, open for lunch from April through October, and administrative offices; as well as outbuildings such as Hill House, which contains a ticket office and administrative offices.

== In the media ==
=== Film and television ===
The Physick Estate was used as a location in the 1981 slasher film The Prowler, which was special effects wizard Tom Savini's second movie. The mansion was also featured on the season 1, episode 6 of Haunted Towns on Destination America and was investigated by series paranormal team, Tennessee Wraith Chasers (TWC). The home is believed to be haunted by Dr. Emlen Physick and his family; his aunts Emilie and Isabella, as well as his mother, Frances Ralston.

A Physick progeny was said to have gone to Korea to further study of parasitology and then branched out to Oriental medicine as part of study of plants.

== Gallery ==
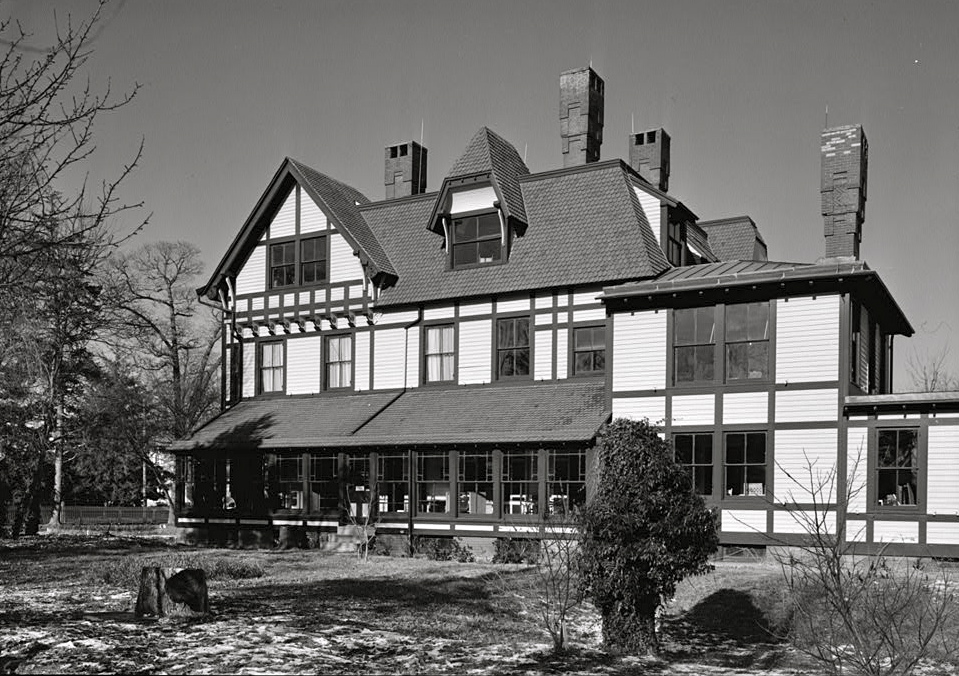
View from the Southwest (from Historic American Buildings Survey HABS No. NJ-746)

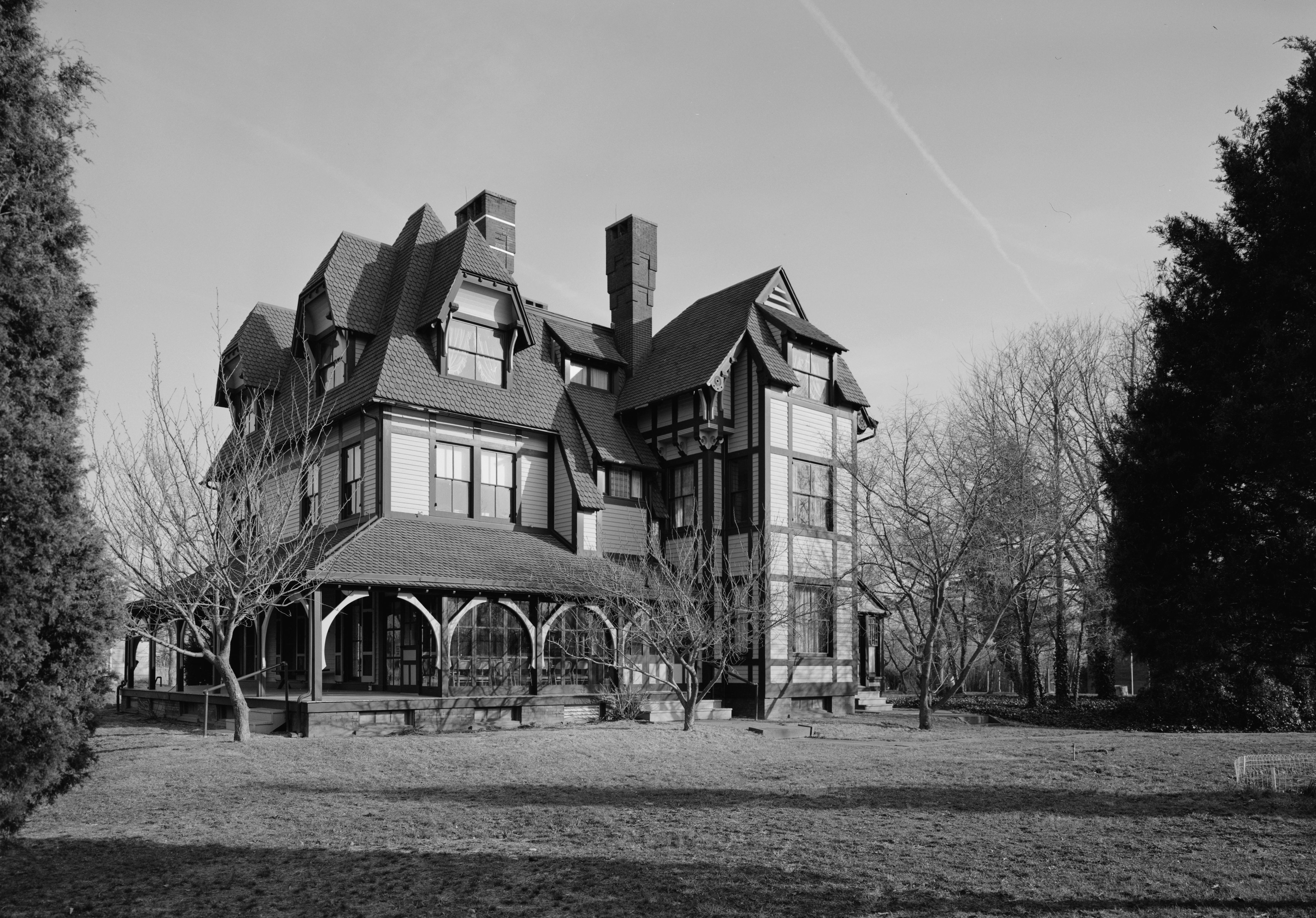
Northeast Side and Northwest Front (from Historic American Buildings Survey HABS No. NJ-746)

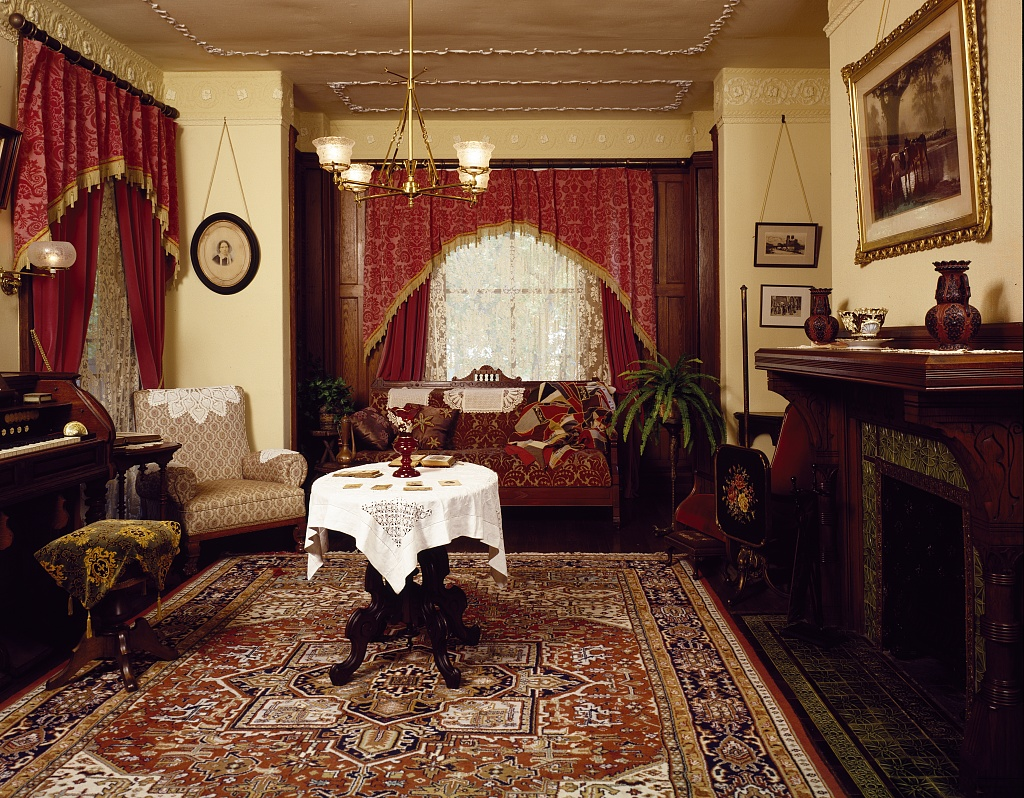
Parlor, featuring original fireplace

Woodwork Details

Chimney Detail

== See also ==
- Cape May Historic District

== Sources ==
- Emlen Physick Estate official site
- Photographs and drawings at the Historic American Buildings Survey
- Thomas, George E.; Carl Doebley; Chris Zelov (1998). Cape May, Queen of the Seaside Resorts: Its History and Architecture (2nd edition). The Knossus Project, Mid-Atlantic Center for the Arts. ISBN 978-0-9663295-0-6. building IX.
