= Ghost Asylum =

Television series

- Also known as: Tennessee Wraith Chasers/TWC
- Genre: Paranormal; Horror Film
- Directed by: Ethan John Browners
- Starring: Scott Porter, Steven McDougal, Chasey Ray McKnight, Brannon Smith, Chris Smith
- Theme music composer: Joey Trae
- Composer: Opus 1 Music Library
- Country of origin: American
- Original language: English
- No. of seasons: 3
- No. of episodes: 30

Production
- Executive producers: Matthew Hobin; Erin L. Ryder; Tim Hamilton; Colleen Needles Steward; Shannon Keenon Demers; Rob Hammersley
- Production location: Winnipeg, Manitoba
- Cinematography: Brain Hodge; Alex Poppas
- Editors: Joseph Evans; Casey Mandel; Alpesh Patel; Anthony Berrios; Dajana Mitchell
- Running time: 45 minutes
- Production company: Tremendous! Entertainment

Original release
- Network: Destination America
- Release: September 7, 2014 – June 5, 2016

Related
- Haunted Towns

Ghost Asylum is an American paranormal television series that aired from September 7, 2014, to June 5, 2016, on Destination America. The series features a group of ghost hunters that try to "trap ghosts" in abandoned asylums, sanitoriums, and mental hospitals claimed to be haunted. The show was renewed for a second season of 15 episodes, which premiered on April 5, 2015, and aired in two halves with the second half airing in late-2014.

The series follows the paranormal team known as the "Tennessee Wraith Chasers"; the pilot of the series was originally named "Ghostland Tennessee" before it was renamed for the Destination America network.

== Premise ==
The series features a group of ghost hunters called the Tennessee Wraith Chasers, who use various methods they believe can "capture spirits" during their investigations of abandoned mental institutions, asylums and other locations claimed to be haunted.

== Series overview ==
| Season | Episodes | Originally released | |
| Season | Episodes | First released | Last released |
|---|---|---|---|
| 1 | 6 | September 7, 2014 | October 12, 2014 |
| 2 | 15 | April 5, 2015 | December 13, 2015 |
| 3 | 9 | April 3, 2016 | June 5, 2016 |

== Episodes ==
=== Season 1 (2014) ===
| No. | Title | Location | Original release date |
|---|---|---|---|
| 1.1 | "Old War Memorial" | Old War Memorial Hospital, Scottsville, Kentucky | September 7, 2014 |
In the series premiere, a group of ghost hunters called the Tennessee Waith Chasers (TWC) hunt for ghosts at Kentucky's Old War Memorial Hospital, where they search for the spirit of a doctor rumored to be haunting the halls of the facility.
| 1.2 | "Kuhn State Hospital" | Kuhn State Hospital, Vicksburg, Mississippi | September 14, 2014 |
The team investigates Mississippi's massive Kuhn State Memorial Hospital, built in 1835 because of a smallpox outbreak; and it also treated wounded Confederate soldiers during the Civil War. They invent a Faraday cage-like box they believe will trap a spirit while ghost hunting.
| 1.3 | "Hayswood Infirmary" | Hayswood Infirmary, Maysville, Kentucky | September 21, 2014 |
TWC investigate the Hayswood Infirmary, which once served as a home for servicemen suffering from PTSD (known then as shell shock) after surviving the attack on Pearl Harbor. The guys also review a disputed raw unedited video capturing a supposed apparition in the hospital's window known as the "Hayswood Ghost".
| 1.4 | "St. Vincent's Home" | St. Vincent's Home, Oklahoma City, Oklahoma | September 28, 2014 |
The team investigates the abandoned St. Vincent's Home, once operated by the Brothers of Mercy. According to them, the home had its share of tragedy, including an incident in 1962 when a male nurse went insane and suffocated two patients, and the murder of a priest years later. They build a vacuum trap with crystals they believe can capture an evil entity.
| 1.5 | "Old Ironton Psychiatric" | Old Ironton Psychiatric, Ironton, Missouri | October 5, 2014 |
TWC investigate the history of Missouri's Old Ironton Psychiatric, an abandoned asylum that harbors the local legend that tells of a deranged patient in the 1950s killing three nurses on the premises and now allegedly haunts the halls. To supposedly trap this ghost, the guys build a big battery shaped like a pyramid that covers a Tesla coil.
| 1.6 | "Cannon Memorial Banner" | Cannon Memorial Hospital, Banner Elk, North Carolina | October 12, 2014 |
The team investigates North Carolina's Cannon Memorial Hospital with a psych ward they say drove its patients insane. According to them, one such patient held a doctor and some nurses at gunpoint in the 1960s before he was apprehended by the police. To supposedly trap a spirit, they build an infrasound generator to boost the sound that they say pushes the entity towards an infinity mirror.

=== Season 2 (2015) ===
| No. | Title | Location | Original release date |
|---|---|---|---|
| 2.1 (7) | "U.S. Marine Hospital" | U.S. Marine Hospital, Memphis, Tennessee | April 5, 2015 |
In the season 2 opener, the Tennessee Wraith Chasers (TWC) stay in their home state where they investigate an American Marine Hospital in Memphis, Tennessee. To supposedly trap the ghost of a Civil War soldier named Henry Wood, they build a "Water Wall Cone" trap, an elaborate fountain that they believe will keep the entity from crossing the curtain of running water.
| 2.2 (8) | "Sloss Furnace" | Sloss Furnaces, Birmingham, Alabama | April 12, 2015 |
TWC investigates Sloss Furnaces in Alabama.
| 2.3 (9) | "Rolling Hills Asylum" | Rolling Hills Asylum, East Bethany, New York | April 19, 2015 |
The Tennessee Wraith Chasers investigate Rolling Hills Asylum.
| 2.4 (10) | "Mansfield Reformatory" | Ohio State Reformatory, Mansfield, Ohio | April 26, 2015 |
The Tennessee Wraith Chasers travel to Ohio to investigate Mansfield Reformatory and explore the prison's history of torture, assault and suicides.
| 2.5 (11) | "St. Albans Sanatorium" | St. Albans Sanatorium, Radford, Virginia | May 3, 2015 |
TWC investigate Albans Sanatorium, a former boys' school and experimental hospital. They try to make contact with what they believe is the spirit of a murdered girl.
| 2.6 (12) | "Waverly Sanatorium" | Waverly Hills Sanatorium, Louisville/Jefferson County, Kentucky | May 10, 2015 |
The Tennessee Wraith Chasers investigate Kentucky's Waverly Hills Sanatorium.
| 2.7 (13) | "Moundsville Penitentiary" | West Virginia State Penitentiary, Moundsville, West Virginia | May 17, 2015 |
The Tennessee Wraith Chasers investigate a penitentiary located in Moundsville, West Virginia.
| 2.8 (14) | "Cannon Memorial Hospital" | Cannon Memorial Hospital, Banner Elk, North Carolina | May 24, 2015 |
TWC return to handle unfinished business at Cannon Memorial Hospital.
| 2.9 (15) | "Fenwick Plantation" | Fenwick Hall, Johns Island, South Carolina | October 16, 2015 |
TWC investigate Fenwick Hall on Fenwick Plantation, a 300-year old brick house that was the home of John Fenwick who filled it with secret rooms, hidden passageways and a tunnel filled with treasure. They learn the story of young lovers Ann and Tony who met a tragic end at Fenwick's hands. During their investigation, the guys search for the spirits of spies, pirates and a headless horsemen. They build what they call an "Electrostatic Shape-Shifter" device that uses a Van de Graaff generator.
| 2.10 (16) | "Pennhurst Asylum" | Pennhurst Asylum, Spring City, Pennsylvania | October 23, 2015 |
TWC head to the Pennhurst Asylum in Pennsylvania, which they say was the site of abusive treatment towards its patients, suicides and other horrors. They create what they call a "Wraith Toy Box" filled with supposed trigger objects.
| 2.11 (17) | "Hill View Manor" | Hill View Manor, New Castle, Pennsylvania | November 6, 2015 |
TWC investigate Hill View Manor, a former poor farm they believe to be one of the most-haunted buildings in Western Pennsylvania. The guys make a "Power Pyramid" made out of granite and quartz with a copper cap, that they say will create kinetic energy to trap spirits.
| 2.12 (18) | "Sibley Mill" | Sibley Mill, Augusta, Georgia | November 22, 2015 |
TWC travel to Augusta to investigate the Sibley Mill, which was once a cotton mill, a fabric factory and a gunpowder works used by the Confederate Army during the Civil War. They create what they call a "Phantom Writer", a case filled with iron powder, making a magnetic field.
| 2.13 (19) | "Fort Delaware" | Fort Delaware, Pea Patch Island, Delaware | November 29, 2015 |
TWC travel to the Delaware State Park to investigate the Fort Delaware, a former Civil War prison camp off the coast of Delaware City, Delaware, where there are claims of a fight occurring between two ghostly generals.
| 2.14 (20) | "The Bissman Building" | Bissman Building, Mansfield, Ohio | December 6, 2015 |
TWC head to haunted Mansfield, Ohio to investigate the Bissman Building, where it is claimed that spirits travel through a dark portal.
| 2.15 (21) | "Old Crow Distillery" | Old Crow Distillery, Frankfort, Kentucky | December 13, 2015 |
TWC travel to Kentucky to investigate the Old Crow Distillery, where they made Old Crow Bourbon, they believe to be haunted by Dr. James Crow. The guys build what they call a "Wraith Casket Trap".

=== Season 3 (2016) ===
| No. | Title | Location | Original release date |
|---|---|---|---|
| 3.1 (22) | "U.S.S. Edson" | USS Edson, Bay City, Michigan | April 3, 2016 |
In the season 3 opener, the Tennessee Wraith Chasers investigate the U.S.S. Edson, a haunted destroyer that served in the Vietnam War currently docked at the Saginaw Valley Naval Ship Museum in Michigan.
| 3.2 (23) | "Old South Pittsburg Hospital" | Old South Pittsburg Hospital, South Pittsburg, Tennessee | April 10, 2016 |
TWC investigate their state's Old South Pittsburg Hospital in Tennessee.
| 3.3 (24) | "Peoria State Hospital" | Peoria State Hospital, Bartonville, Illinois | April 17, 2016 |
TWC head to Illinois to investigate Peoria State Hospital where they say many deaths from disease, abuse, and suicide all took place. They are joined by Emily and Gina from St. Louis, Missouri.
| 3.4 (25) | "Missouri State Penitentiary" | Missouri State Penitentiary, Jefferson City, Missouri | April 24, 2016 |
The TWC travel to Missouri to investigate claims of hauntings at the Missouri State Penitentiary, operated from the 19th century until its closure in 2004, dubbed "The most violent 47 acres in America" due to riots, and violence.
| 3.5 (26) | "Castillo de San Marcos" | Castillo de San Marcos, St. Augustine, Florida | May 1, 2016 |
TWC travels to Florida to investigate tales of spirits and hauntings at the infamous Castillo de San Marcos
| 3.6 (27) | "Pauly Jail" | Pauly Jail, Union Springs, Alabama | May 8, 2016 |
TWC investigate the Pauly Jail, the oldest working jail in Alabama, built in 1897. It's said to be haunted by the spirits of former inmates who died there.
| 3.7 (28) | "Preston Castle" | Preston Castle, Ione, California | May 15, 2016 |
TWC head out west to Ione, California to investigate Preston Castle, a reformatory for troubled boys in the state, supposedly haunted by those souls who died there.
| 3.8 (29) | "Coco Palms Resort" | Coco Palms Resort, Kauaʻi, Hawaii | May 22, 2016 |
TWC travel to the island of Kauaʻi to investigate the abandoned Coco Palms Resort that's said to be haunted by ancient Hawaiian spirits known as "choking ghosts" who strangle their victims, and the night marchers.
| 3.9 (30) | "Brushy Mountain State Penitentiary" | Brushy Mountain State Penitentiary, Petros, Tennessee | June 5, 2016 |
TWC returns to their home state to investigate Brushy Mountain State Penitentiary, which held some of the most violent criminals in Tennessee, including it most infamous inmate, James Earl Ray.

== See also ==
- Haunted Towns
- Apparitional experience
- Parapsychology
- Ghost hunting
