= Oceanside Pier =

Second longest wooden pier in the West Coast of the US

- Oceanside Pier at sunset
- Type: Fishing Pier
- Spans: Pacific Ocean
- Coordinates: 33.191672°N 117.388852°W
- Official name: Oceanside Municipal Pier
- Toll: Open to the Public

Characteristics
- Total length: 1,954 feet (596 m)

History
- Opening date: 1888
- Location of Oceanside Pier

The Oceanside Pier is a wooden pier located in Oceanside, California of North County (San Diego area). It is currently the second longest wooden pier in the West Coast of the United States, after the Santa Cruz Wharf.

== History ==
The pier was first built in 1888 at what is now Wisconsin Avenue. The original pier was destroyed by storms in the winter of 1890, and was rebuilt in 1893 by Melchoir Pieper at what is now Pier View Way, where all subsequent piers would be located. Four iterations of the pier were built and then destroyed by heavy storms. The current pier was built and formally opened to the public in September 1987, at a cost of $5 million.

At the foot of the pier is the Junior Seau Pier Amphitheatre, which hosts numerous events throughout the year. The Junior Seau Beach Community Center, also known as the Beach Recreation Center, is a 17,000 square feet (1,600 m^{2}) facility located near the pier that includes a gymnasium, meeting room, stage, and kitchen. Both the amphitheater and the community center were renamed posthumously in 2012 in honor of hometown football hero Junior Seau.

=== 2024 fire ===
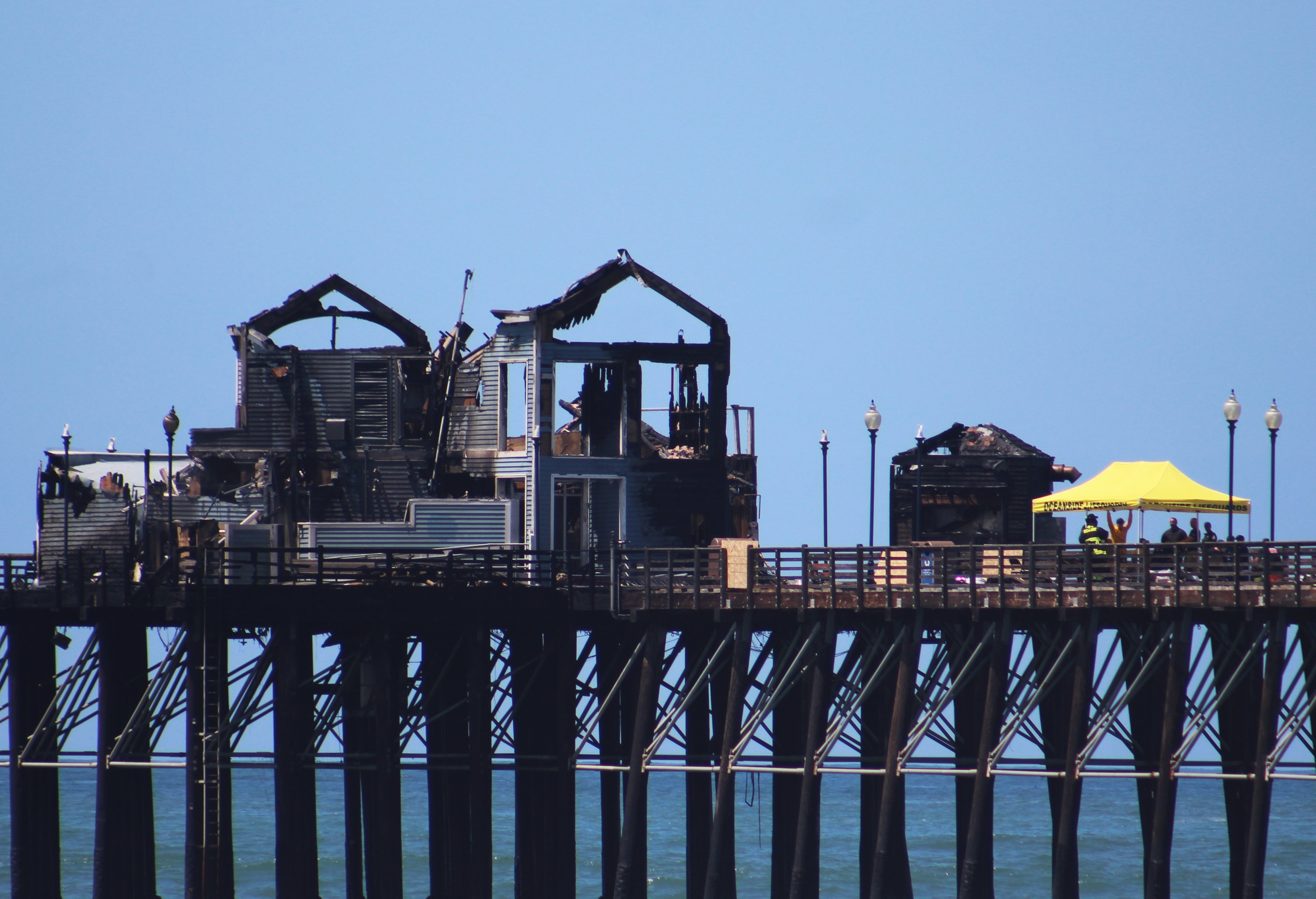
Aftermath of the fire

At around 3:00 p.m. PDT on April 25, 2024, a major fire broke out at the far end of the pier. The pier was swiftly evacuated and no injuries were reported. Portions of the pier continued to smolder into the following day. While acknowledging that the fire had not yet been declared under control, the city's fire chief estimated at midday on April 26 that 90% of the pier was undamaged. The fire's point of origin was determined to be the former Ruby's Diner, a 1950s-style diner, located at the end of the pier. Opened in 1996 and vacated in 2021, the structure was being remodeled prior to the fire, which effectively destroyed it.

Rebuilding the pier is expected to begin in mid 2027 at an estimated cost of $17 million.

== Activities ==
Now in its sixth incarnation (built in 1987), the pier is a popular fishing spot. Surfing is also very popular on both the North and South sides of the pier.

== Parking ==
Pre-pay parking is available along Mission Ave, N. Pacific St, N. Myers, and as well as on N. Cleveland St. Metered parking is also available on Pier View Way. Parking regulations are very strict in Oceanside, especially near the pier and the harbor.

== Additional images ==
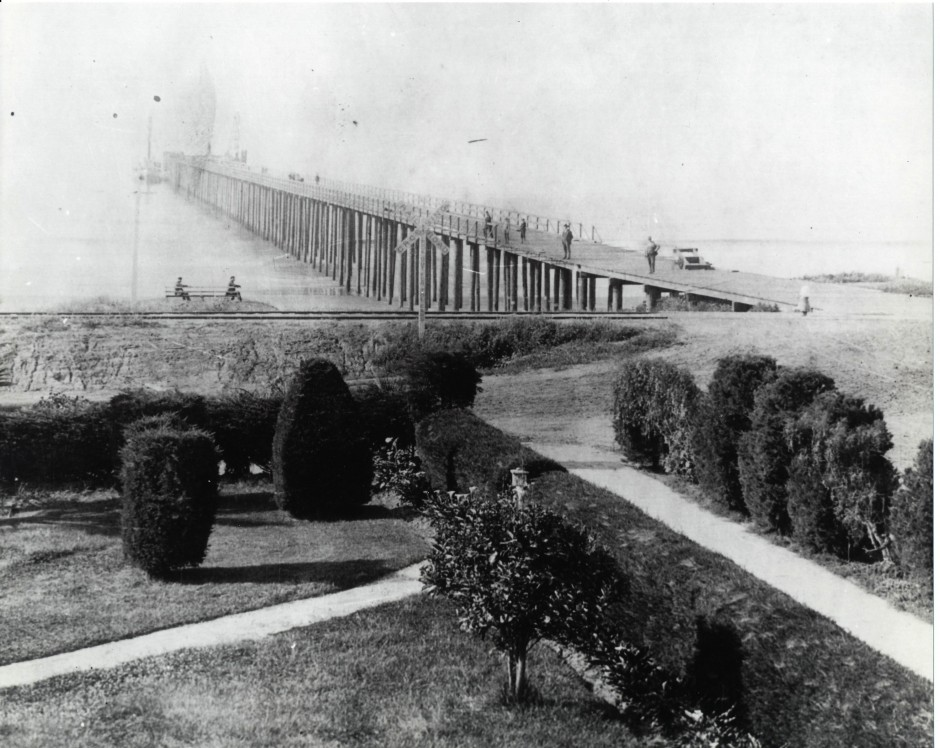
Oceanside Pier in the early 1900s

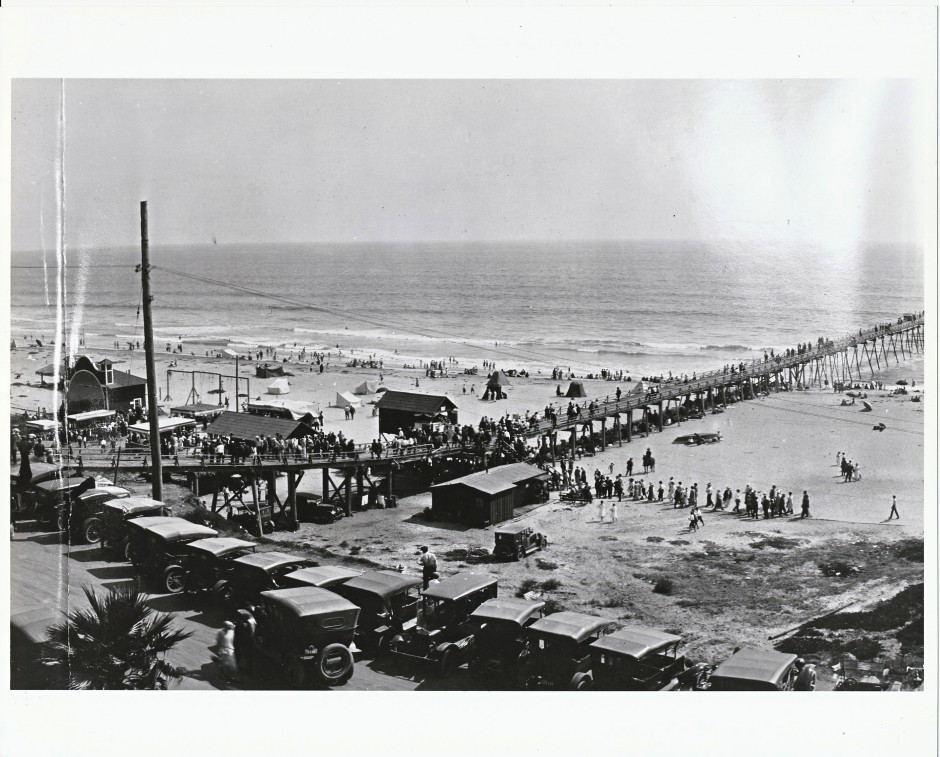
Oceanside Pier in 1920

Oceanside Pier

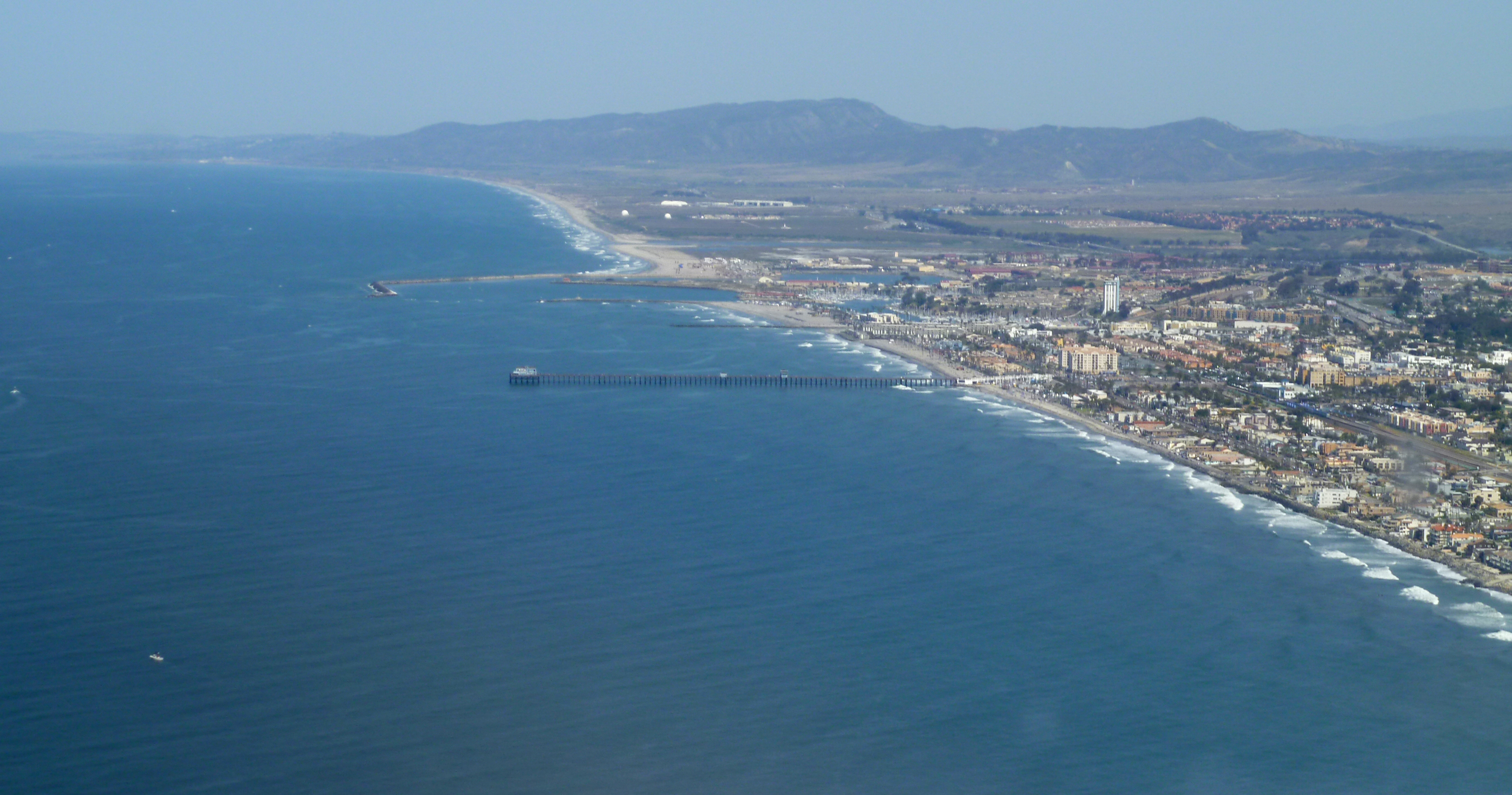
Aerial view

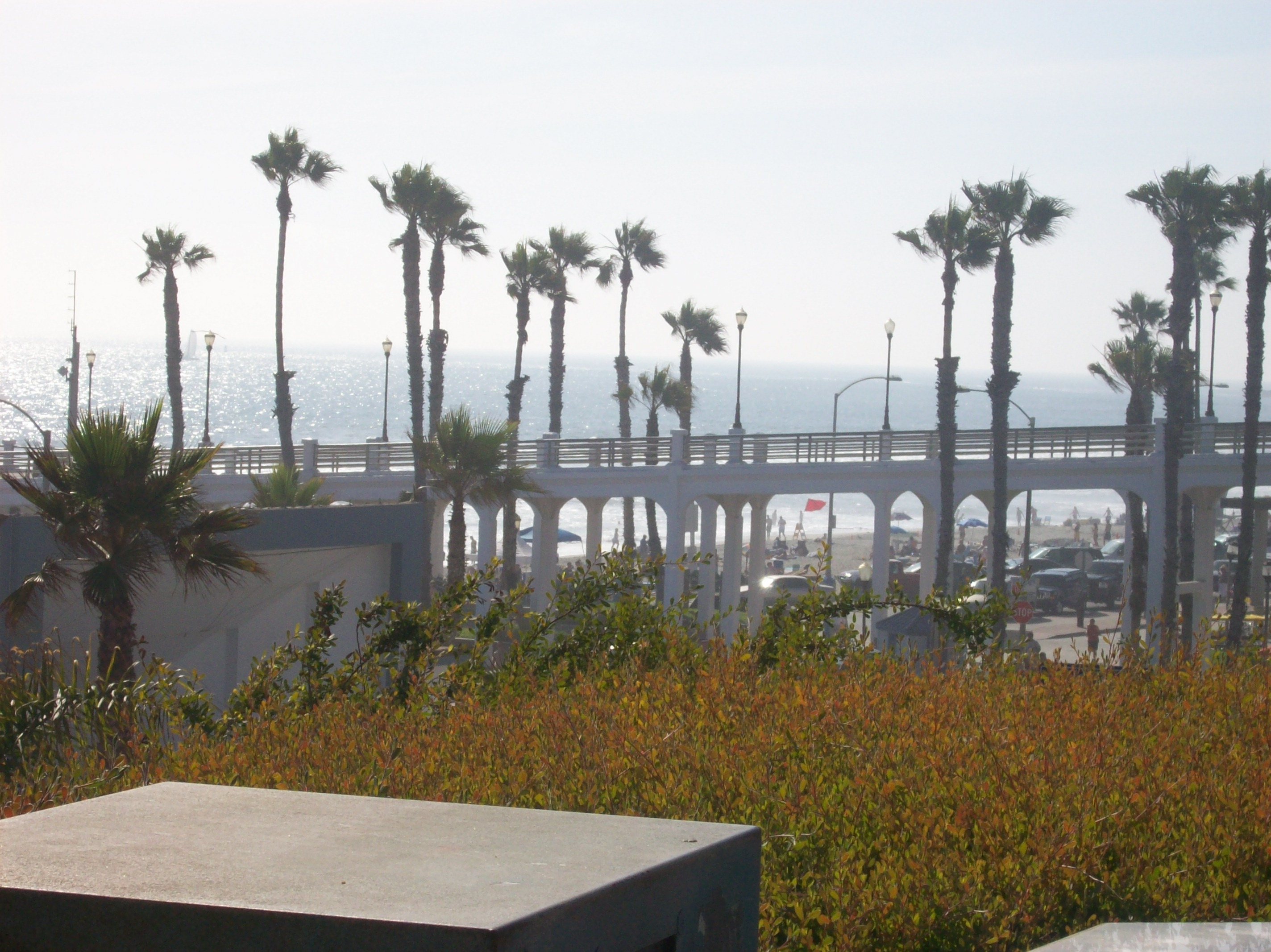
Oceanside Pier

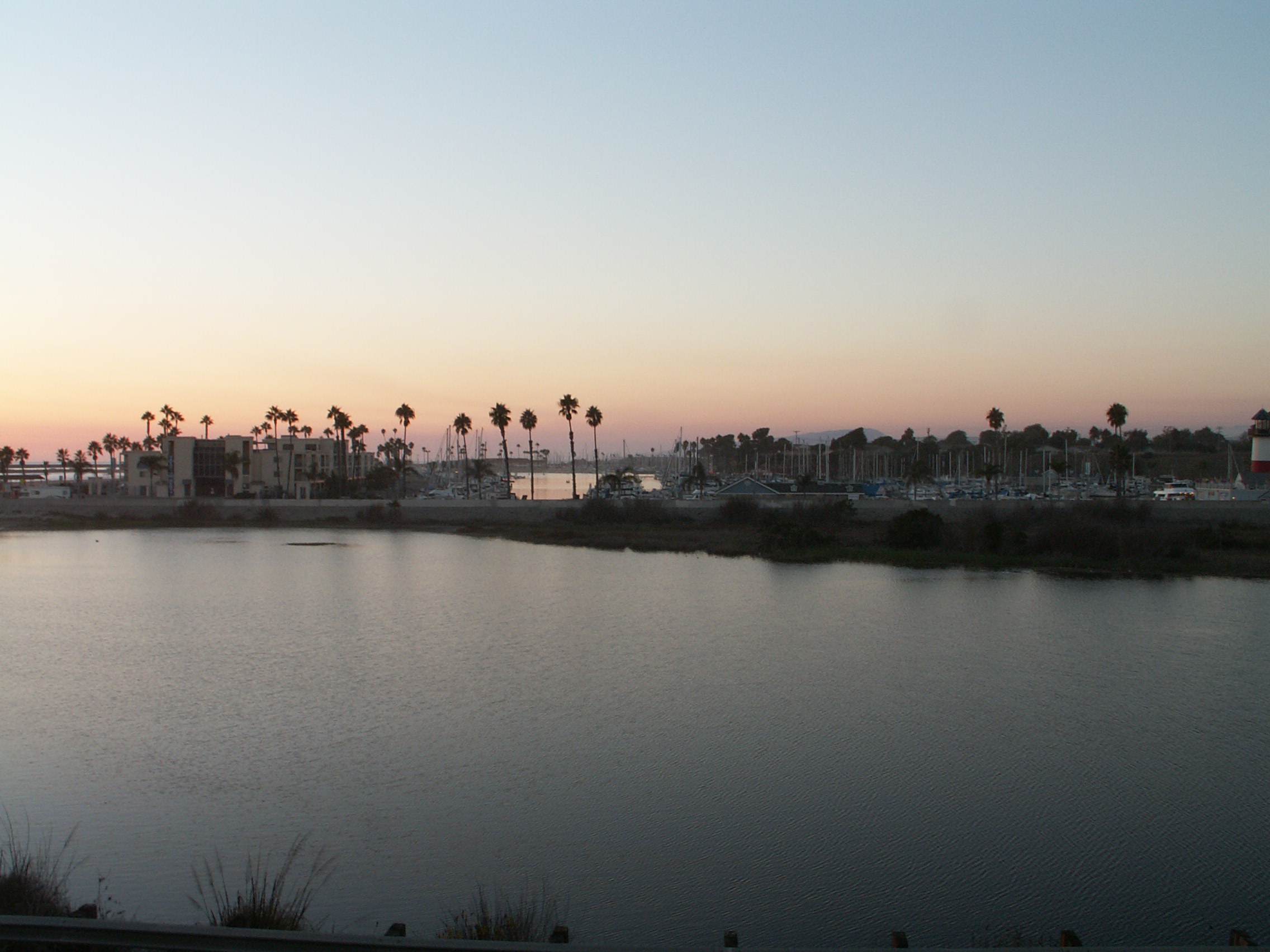
Oceanside Marina
