= Haunted Towns =

Haunted Tv show

- Also known as: Most Haunted Towns
- Genre: Paranormal; Reality television
- Starring: Scott Porter, Steven McDougal, Brannon Smith, Chris Smith
- Composers: APM Music, LLC; Audio Network
- Country of origin: United States
- Original language: English
- No. of seasons: 2
- No. of episodes: 14

Production
- Executive producers: Colleen Needles Steward; Shannon Keenan Demers Devon Platte
- Cinematography: Alex Poppas
- Editors: Spencer Keimon; Dajana Mitchell
- Running time: 45 minutes
- Production company: Tremendous! Entertainment

Original release
- Network: Destination America
- Release: August 15, 2017 – August 9, 2019

Related
- Ghost Asylum; Haunted Live

Haunted Towns is an American paranormal television series that premiered on August 15, 2017 on Destination America. The series features the Tennessee Wraith Chasers, a group of professional paranormal investigators that are known for trying to "trap ghosts" during their investigations. TWC continue on their paranormal journey by traveling to the most haunted locations in the most haunted towns in America. The show initially aired on Tuesdays at 10 p.m. EST. For its second season, it was broadcast on the Travel Channel on Fridays.

== Premise ==
The series features the Tennessee Wraith Chasers, who are back chasing ghosts using their Southern know-how, science, and engineering during their paranormal investigations. This time, they investigate the most haunted locations in the most haunted towns in America, exploring the town's dark history, legend and local lore.

Opening introduction (Season 1):

We're the Tennessee Wraith Chasers. We travel America exploring the country's most haunted towns, investigating paranormal stories that have spooked locals for generations. We combine historical research with modern science, and some good old-fashioned Southern know-how, to find the truth at the heart of the legends. Just a bunch of good old boys having a little fun, chasing ghosts around America. This is Haunted Towns.

Opening introduction (Season 2):

There are towns that live in the shadows of the dead, where traumas of the past have left a terrifying imprint on the present. We're the Tennessee Wraith Chasers, and we're unraveling the dark mysteries hiding inside America's haunted past. This is Haunted Towns.

== Cast ==
Tennessee Wraith Chasers:

- Chris Smith - "The Architect", TWC Founder
- Steven "Doogie" McDougal - "The Complainer", TWC Co-Founder
- Scott Porter - "The Profiler", TWC Historian
- Brannon Smith - "The Engineer", TWC Inventor
- Mike Goncalves - "The Surveillance Guru", TWC Audio Tech

== Episodes ==
=== Season 1 (2017) ===
No. overall	No. in season	Title	Location	Original release date	U.S. viewers (millions)
1	1	"Gettysburg"	Gettysburg, Pennsylvania	August 15, 2017	0.265
In the series premiere, Tennessee Waith Chasers (TWC), the Southern boys are back to continue their paranormal mission; hunt for ghosts in the most haunted towns in America. Their first stop is Gettysburg, Pennsylvania, site of the bloodiest battle in the American Civil War. They investigate the Confederate side of the war by visiting Mason Dixon Militaria building and the Stewart Farm; both locations are where the rebels retreated after being driven out of town by Union troops.
2	2	"Salem"	Salem, Massachusetts	August 22, 2017	0.241
TWC head up to New England to investigate three locations in Salem, Massachusetts, site of the Salem Witch Trials of 1692. After chatting with "Wicked Salem" and "Ghosts of Salem" author Sam Baltrusis, they look for connections of the execution of accused witches like Alice Parker and Mary Easty at Pierce Farm, the Parson Bernard House and Cinema Salem, once home to Samuel Beadle's Tavern, where the accusers gathered to start witchcraft rumors and John Westgate allegedly encountered a spectral hog.
3	3	"Savannah"	Savannah, Georgia	August 29, 2017	0.251
TWC travel to the low country, Savannah, Georgia, one of the most haunted cities in the country. The guys investigate paranormal hotspots; Wright Square, known as the 'Hanging Square' since it was home to the courthouse gallows, Wright Square Café, and Liquid Glass Gallery; all connected to the ghost of Alice Riley, a servant searching for her baby.
4	4	"Vicksburg"	Vicksburg, Mississippi	September 5, 2017	0.223
TWC head to the deep south to investigate the town of Vicksburg, Mississippi. Founded in 1811, it was the site of the Siege of Vicksburg during the Civil War. They investigate paranormal hotspots; McRaven House, the most haunted home in the state, Cobb House and Stouts Bayou, which were all connected to the murder of local John Bobb.
5	5	"Bisbee"	Bisbee, Arizona	September 12, 2017	0.227
TWC head out west to explore the haunted mining town of Bisbee, Arizona, home of the Queen Copper Mine. The guys follow in the miners footsteps by investigating that place they lived, the Silver King Hotel, haunted by a Chinese laundress, and learn about the Deportation Strike of 1917 when miners were run out of town, causing residual hauntings.
6	6	"Cape May"	Cape May, New Jersey	September 19, 2017	n/a
TWC head to the Jersey Shore to visit Cape May, New Jersey, home to spiritualism in the Victorian era. Founded in 1685, this seaside town is one of the oldest and possibly the most haunted in America. They investigate town landmark, Emlen Physick Estate, where its believed to have a portal where the spirits of the Physick family come and go. Next, the guys investigate the Cape May Fish Market, a restaurant on the Washington Street Mall, where a child's presence is reportedly seen upstairs.
7	7	"Fall River"	Fall River, Massachusetts	September 26, 2017	0.187
TWC travel to New England to investigate the quaint town with a dark past, Fall River, Massachusetts, once home to Lizzie Borden and the infamous axe murders of 1892. The guys try to walk in Lizzie's shoes; first by visiting her family's house, the scene of the crimes and currently a bed and breakfast. Then they go to the Ash Street Jail where she awaited her trial and lastly, the Central Congregational Church, where she taught Sunday school and sought solace after the murders.
8	8	"McDonough"	McDonough, Georgia	October 3, 2017	0.210
TWC heads to McDonough, Georgia, a small southern town that was the site of one of deadliest train crashes in American history. On June 23, 1900, a heavy storm washed out the Camp Creek Bridge, causing the No.7 train to plummet into the water below, killing 39 people aboard. The victims bodies were laid out in the town square and businesses were flooded with the dead which left a dark energy on the community. They investigate in Heritage Park where the train stands monument and locals hear ghost train whistles and disembodied voices. They also investigate a doll named "Claire" that is said to terrorize its owner who thinks is connected to the train tragedy.

=== Season 2 (2019) ===
No. overall	No. in season	Title	Location	Original release date	U.S. viewers (millions)
9	1	"Voodoo on the Bayou"	Manchac, Louisiana	June 21, 2019	0.488
The Tennessee Wraith Chasers are back in action for their second season when the head to the bayou to explore Manchac Swamp. TWC are the first paranormal team ever to investigate the swamp which was the site of the largest slave revolt in America. Today, its home to many restless spirits dating back from 200 years ago.
10	2	"Ghosts of the Gallows"	Boise, Idaho	June 28, 2019	0.427
TWC head to Boise, Idaho to investigate the Old Idaho State Penitentiary a territorial prison built in 1870. During their investigation, they make contact with the ghosts of two infamous inmates who both committed murder long ago.
11	3	"Phantoms of the Frontier"	Independence, Missouri	July 5, 2019	0.441
TWC travel to Independence, Mississippi, the "Gateway to the West" to investigate claims of aggressive paranormal activity believed to be the spirits of madmen and murderers that once inhabited the town.
12	4	"Wraith Revenge"	Rawlings, Wyoming	July 12, 2019	0.407
TWC head to the former frontier town of Rawlins to investigate the Wyoming Frontier Prison, built in 1888 and known for the botched hanging of one of its most notorious criminals. Today, some believe this outlaw is looking for revenge in the afterlife.
13	5	"Vigilante Vengeance"	Virginia City, Montana	July 19, 2019	0.427
TWC travel to Montana for the very first time to investigate the haunted ghost town of Virginia City, a former Wild West city known for its excessive crimes and mass hangings.
14	6	"Five Miles From Hell"	Port Townsend, Washington	July 26, 2019	N/A
TWC continue their haunted journey out west; this time to the Pacific northwest to Washington state. They investigate Port Townsend, a town known for its criminal past, curses, and broken dreams that left behind a dark energy of angry entities.
15	7	"Darkness in the Underworld"	Pendleton, Oregon	August 2, 2019	N/A
TWC visits the 'old town' section of Pendleton, Oregon, where Chinese immigrants who worked on the transcontinental railroad built underground tunnels hidden from the public. They investigate the maze of tunnels that lead to a mysterious underworld of darkness.
16	8	"Wrath of the Fire Goddess"	Hilo, Hawaii	August 9, 2019	N/A
TWC head to the Big Island of Hawaii to investigate the town of Hilo where voices are heard in the lava tubes warn of impending danger. They also research the vengeful fire goddess Pele.

== See also ==
- Apparitional experience
- Parapsychology
- Ghost hunting
