= Junior Seau Pier Amphitheatre =

Recreational complex

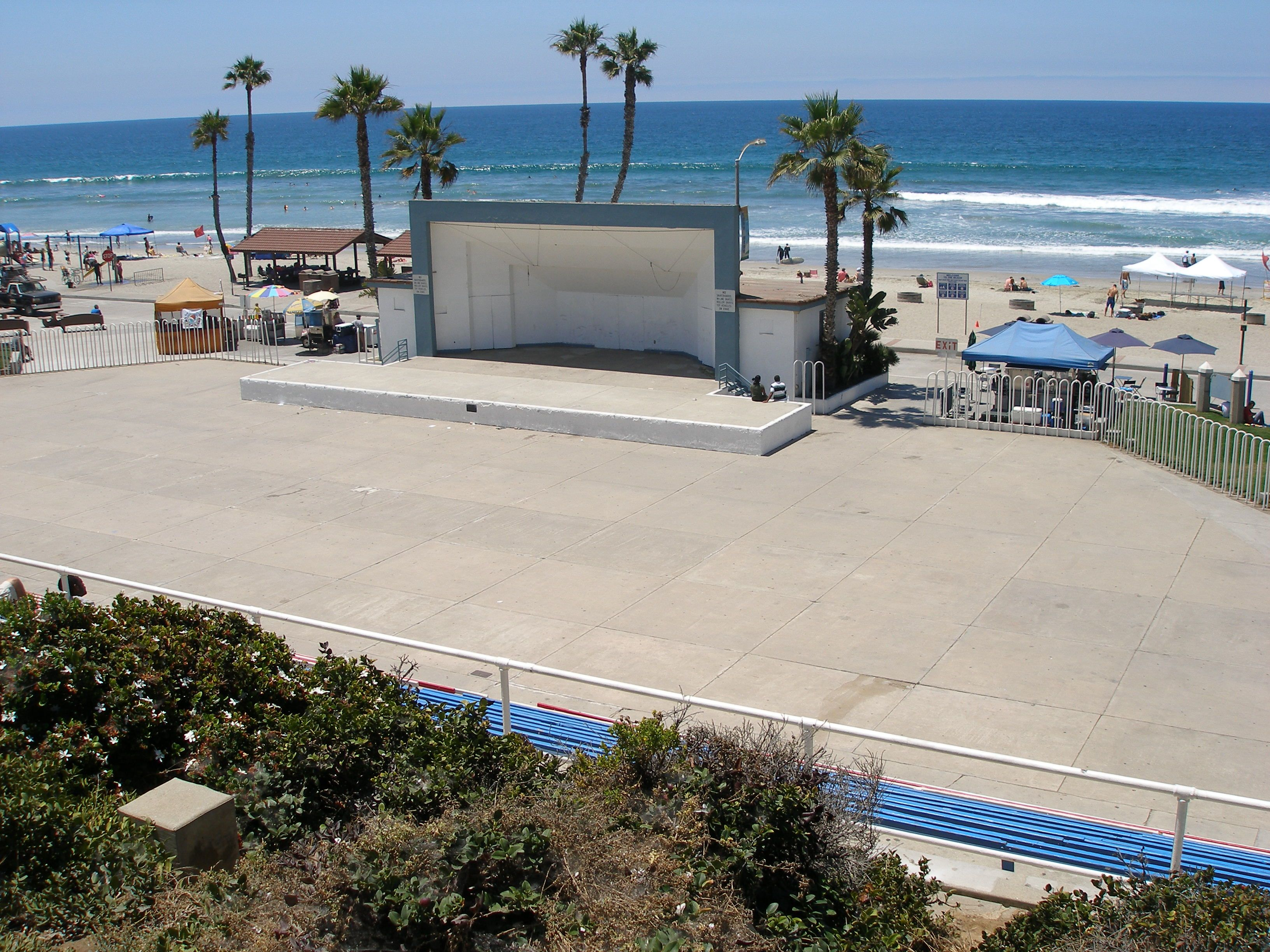
- The amphitheatre in 2012
- Interactive map of Junior Seau Pier Amphitheatre
- Former names: Oceanside Pier Amphitheater; Oceanside Bandshell
- Address: 200 N the Strand, Oceanside, CA 92054
- Location: Oceanside, CA
- Coordinates: 33°11′38.81″N 117°23′0.88″W
- Seating type: benches and folding chairs
- Capacity: 1500–2500

Construction
- Built: 1919
- Renovated: 1927, 1937, 1950

The Junior Seau Pier Amphitheatre is a public entertainment and recreation complex located at the foot of the Oceanside Pier in Oceanside, California. Formerly known as the Oceanside Pier Amphitheater, also known as Oceanside Bandshell, the complex was renamed in 2012 posthumously in honor of football player Junior Seau. Seau was a hometown hero to Oceanside, especially its Samoan community.

== History ==
The Oceanside Bandshell (the original name for the Oceanside Pier Amphitheater) was constructed in 1937 as a project of the federal Works Progress Administration and significantly altered in 1950. The current structure is the third in a series of bandshells or amphitheaters at that location, the first one built in 1919 and the second in 1927.

The amphitheater is a local landmark, located right on the beach. It has permanent benches for 1500 people and room for an additional 1000 folding or temporary chairs. It has been used to host large concert events, movies, awards ceremonies, and other local events for many years. It serves as the graduation venue for Oceanside High School and hosts other annual events such as Juneteenth and Cinco de Mayo celebrations. It has hosted an annual Tea Party anti-tax rally on or around April 15th since 2010, and a salute to the military called "Operation Appreciation" every May since 2002. It has played host to a number of well-known musical acts, including The Black Keys and Creedence Clearwater Revisited.

The bandshell was featured in the film Bring It On as a venue for a cheerleading competition.

== Renaming ==
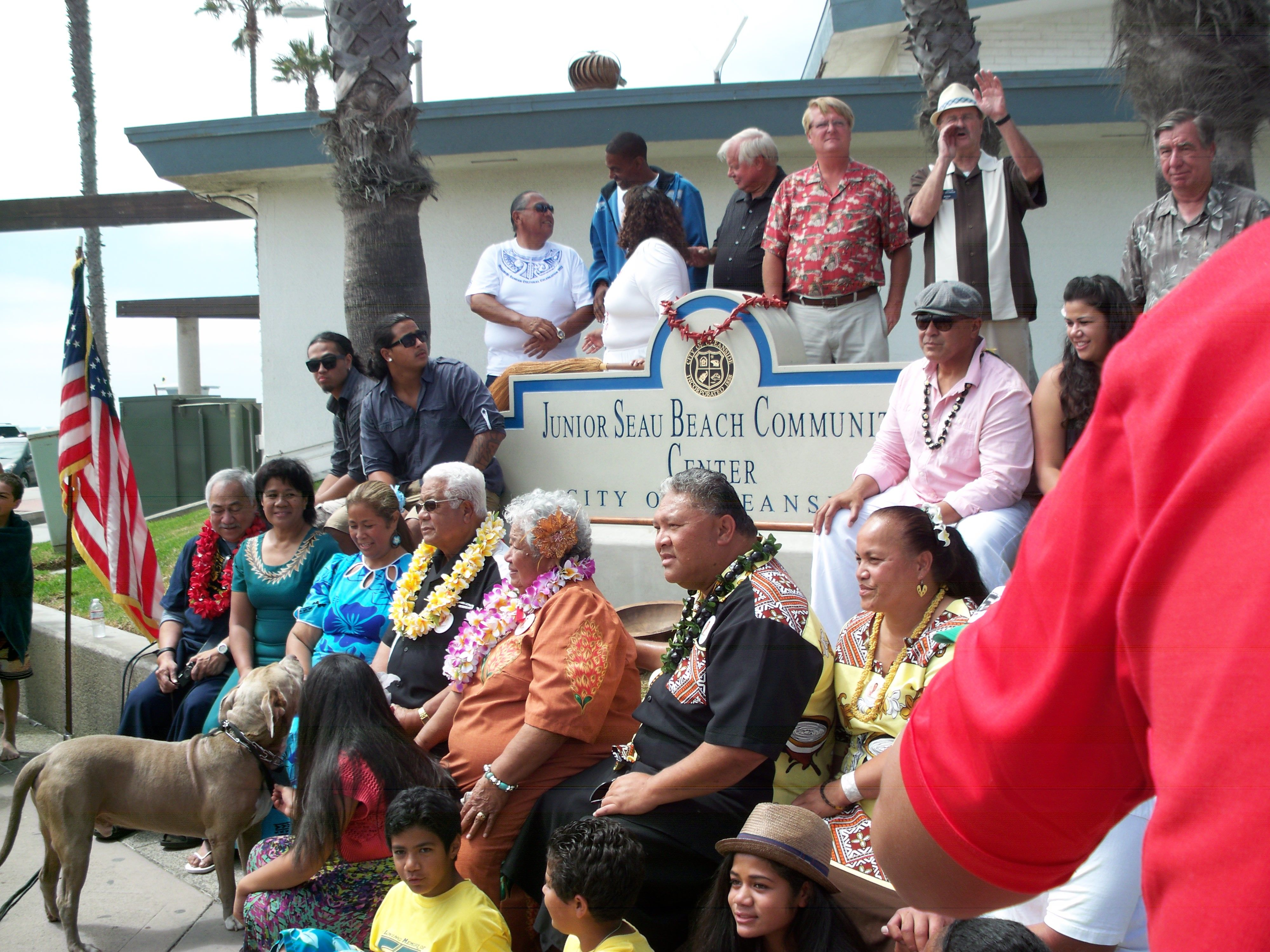
Elected officials and Seau's family surround the placard designating the Junior Seau Beach Community Center at its unveiling on July 7, 2012

On May 16, 2012, the Oceanside City Council voted to name the amphitheatre, as well as its beach community center, in honor of Junior Seau. Seau was an Oceanside native of Samoan descent. He graduated from Oceanside High School and played professional football for the hometown San Diego Chargers for 13 seasons. He committed suicide at his home in Oceanside on May 2, 2012. Seau used to lead children through a weekly exercise routine at the amphitheater. The complex is just a few blocks from Seau's home.

The Junior Seau Pier Amphitheatre and Junior Seau Beach Community Center were officially dedicated on July 7, 2012 as part of the final day of Oceanside's 2012 Samoan Cultural Celebration. The featured speaker was United States Representative Eni Faleomavaega (D-Samoa).
