= Junior Seau =

American football player (1969–2012)

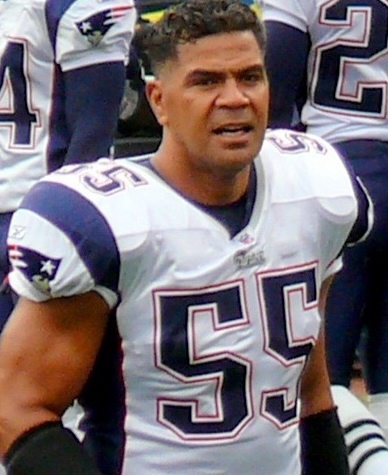
- Seau with the New England Patriots in 2008

No. 55
- Position: Linebacker

Personal information
- Born: January 19, 1969; San Diego, California, U.S.
- Died: May 2, 2012 (aged 43); Oceanside, California, U.S.
- Listed height: 6 ft 3 in (1.91 m)
- Listed weight: 250 lb (113 kg)

Career information
- High school: Oceanside
- College: USC (1987–1989)
- NFL draft: 1990: 1st round, 5th overall pick

Career history
- San Diego Chargers (1990–2002); Miami Dolphins (2003–2005); New England Patriots (2006–2009)

Awards and highlights
- NFL Man of the Year (1994); 6× First-team All-Pro (1992–1994, 1996, 1998, 2000); 3× Second-team All-Pro (1995, 1997, 1999); 12× Pro Bowl (1991–2002); NFL solo tackles co-leader (1994) (Note: Tied with Chris Spielman); NFL 1990s All-Decade Team; NFL 100th Anniversary All-Time Team; Los Angeles Chargers Hall of Fame; Los Angeles Chargers No. 55 retired; Second-team All-American (1989); Pac-10 Defensive Player of the Year (1989); First-team All-Pac-10 (1989)

Career NFL statistics
- Tackles: 1,847
- Sacks: 56.5
- Interceptions: 18
- Interception yards: 238
- Forced fumbles: 11
- Fumble recoveries: 18
- Defensive touchdowns: 1
- Stats at Pro Football Reference
- Pro Football Hall of Fame

Tiaina Baul "Junior" Seau Jr. (/ˈseɪ.aʊ/; SAY-ow; January 19, 1969 – May 2, 2012) was an American professional football linebacker who played in the National Football League (NFL) for 20 seasons. A member of the San Diego Chargers for most of his career, he is regarded as one of the greatest linebackers of all time.

Seau played college football for the USC Trojans, earning All-American honors and winning Pac-10 Defensive Player of the Year in 1989. He was selected fifth overall in the 1990 NFL draft by the Chargers, where he spent his first 13 seasons. During his San Diego tenure, he received 12 consecutive Pro Bowl and six first-team All-Pro selections. Seau also led the league in solo tackles in 1994 en route to the franchise's first Super Bowl appearance in Super Bowl XXIX. After being traded from the Chargers, Seau was a member of the Miami Dolphins for three seasons. He played his last four seasons with the New England Patriots, where he was a member of the 2007 team that won all 16 regular season games and appeared in Super Bowl XLII.

Three years after his retirement, Seau committed suicide in 2012. Seau was later diagnosed with chronic traumatic encephalopathy (CTE), a brain disease found in other deceased NFL players, drawing further scrutiny towards the health of football athletes. He was posthumously inducted to the Pro Football Hall of Fame in 2015.

== Early life ==
Seau was born on January 19, 1969, in San Diego, California, the fifth child of Tiaina Seau Sr. and Luisa Mauga Seau of Aunu'u, American Samoa. Tiaina Sr.'s grandfather was a village chief in Pago Pago. Tiaina Sr. worked at a rubber factory and was a school custodian, and Luisa worked at the commissary of Camp Pendleton in Southern California and a laundromat. After Seau was born, the family moved back to American Samoa for several years before returning to San Diego; Seau did not learn to speak English until he was seven years old. At home, Seau and his three brothers had to sleep in the family's one-car garage.

Seau attended Oceanside High School in Oceanside, where he lettered in football, basketball, and track and field. As a football player, Seau was a starter at linebacker and tight end, and as a senior, he was named the Avocado League offensive MVP and led the 18-member Oceanside Pirates team to the San Diego 2A championship. Parade selected Seau to its high school All-American team.

In basketball, as a senior, he was named the California Interscholastic Federation San Diego Section Player of the Year. He helped his team win the 1987 Lt. James Mitchell Tournament and make third place in the Mt. Carmel Invitational. In track and field, he was the Avocado League champion in the shot put. Seau was also named to California's all-academic team with a 3.6 grade-point average.

== College career ==
After graduating from high school, Seau attended the University of Southern California (USC). He had to sit out from football in his freshman season due to his 690 SAT score on the college entrance exam, which was 10 points short of USC's minimum score for freshman eligibility.

Seau told Sports Illustrated: "I was labeled a dumb jock. I went from being a four-sport star to an ordinary student at USC. I found out who my true friends were. Nobody stuck up for me—not our relatives, best friends or neighbors. There's a lot of jealousy among Samoans, not wanting others to get ahead in life, and my parents got an earful at church: 'We told you he was never going to make it.' " This prompted him to apologize to his coaches, teachers, and principal at Oceanside High.

Seau lettered in his final two seasons with the USC Trojans, 1988 and 1989, posting 19 sacks in 1989 en route to a unanimous first-team All-American selection.

== Professional career ==
=== San Diego Chargers ===
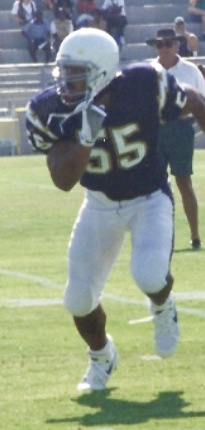
Seau at training camp in 1994

After three years as a Trojan, Seau entered the NFL draft after his junior season and was chosen in the first round of the 1990 NFL draft by Bobby Beathard's San Diego Chargers as the fifth overall draft pick. Seau quickly became one of the most popular players on the Chargers, receiving the nickname "Tasmanian Devil", after the wild antics of the cartoon character. He became the face of the Chargers franchise and a San Diego sports icon.

Seau started 15 of the 16 games he played in during his rookie season, and was named an alternate to the 1991 Pro Bowl after recording 85 tackles. In 1991, he picked up 129 tackles and seven sacks and was named to the 1992 Pro Bowl, the first of 12 consecutive Pro Bowls for Seau. In 1992, he was awarded the George Halas Trophy by the Newspaper Enterprise Association as the NFL's top defensive player, NFL Defensive Player of the Year by Football Digest, AFC Defensive Player of the Year by United Press International, and the NFL Players Association (NFLPA) AFC Linebacker of the Year. He also won the NFLPA award in 1993 and 1994.

He started no fewer than 13 games for the Chargers over each of the ensuing 11 seasons, registering a career-high 155 tackles in 1994, when he led his team to a championship appearance in Super Bowl XXIX. In one of the greatest games in his career, he recorded 16 tackles in the 1994 AFC Championship Game while playing with a pinched nerve in his neck in a 17–13 victory over the Pittsburgh Steelers. Despite San Diego's 1–15 record in 2000, the NFL Alumni Association named him their Linebacker of the Year. In 2002, his final year with the Chargers, he logged a then-career low 83 tackles and missed his final Pro Bowl due to an ankle injury.

=== Miami Dolphins ===
On April 16, 2003, Seau was traded to the Miami Dolphins for a conditional draft choice. He started 15 games that season for the 10-6 Dolphins and was one of their standout defensive players. However, in 2004, a torn pectoral muscle limited Seau to eight games, 68 tackles, and one sack. He started five of the first seven games he played in with the Dolphins in 2005, but was placed on injured reserve on November 24 with an achilles tendon injury. On March 6, 2006, Seau was released by the Dolphins.

=== New England Patriots ===
Seau announced his retirement at an emotional press conference on August 14, 2006. He called it his "graduation" because he was not going to stop working. He contended that he was merely moving on to the next phase of his life.

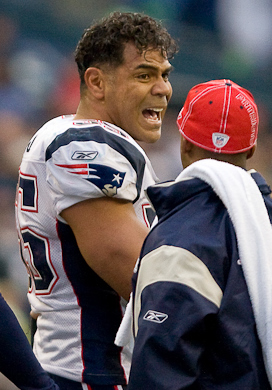
Seau with the Patriots in 2008

Seau returned to football just four days later, signing with the New England Patriots. He started 10 of the first 11 games for the Patriots, recording 69 tackles before breaking his right arm while making a tackle in a game against the Chicago Bears. He was placed on injured reserve on November 27.

On May 21, 2007, Seau re-signed with the Patriots for the 2007 season. In September 2007, Seau was named one of the Patriots' seven captains. He was a prominent contributor to the Patriots undefeated regular season that year. He started four of the 16 games he played in for the Patriots in 2007, and then started the Patriots' two playoff games before Super Bowl XLII against the New York Giants. New England's undefeated streak ended with a Super Bowl loss to the Giants.

After the Patriots had a number of injuries late in the 2008 season, they re-signed Seau. He started two of four games he played. On December 22, 2008, a fan was arrested for trespassing and assault and battery for tackling Seau as he stood on the New England sideline during a home game against the Arizona Cardinals. Seau stated that he did not feel threatened by the fan; he thought that the fan was happy and excited, and just got carried away.

On October 7, 2009, NFL Network reported that the Patriots had an "agreement in principle" with Seau for a fourth one-year deal; Seau took physicals and worked out with the team. He officially signed on October 13. He was active for 7 games for the Patriots in 2009, recording 14 tackles as a reserve linebacker.

=== Retirement ===
Seau announced his intention to retire permanently on the television program Inside the NFL on January 13, 2010.

== NFL career statistics ==
Year	Team	GP	Tackles				Fumbles			Interceptions					
Year	Team	GP	Cmb	Solo	Ast	Sck	FF	FR	Yds	Int	Yds	Avg	Lng	TD	PD
1990	SD	16	85	61	24	1.0	0	0	0	0	0	0.0	0	0	1
1991	SD	16	129	111	18	7.0	0	0	0	0	0	0.0	0	0	2
1992	SD	15	102	79	23	4.5	1	1	0	2	51	25.5	29	0	10
1993	SD	16	129	110	19	0.0	1	1	0	2	58	29.0	42	0	11
1994	SD	16	154	123	31	5.5	1	3	0	0	0	0.0	0	0	3
1995	SD	16	128	111	17	2.0	1	3	0	2	5	2.5	3	1	8
1996	SD	15	139	111	28	7.0	1	3	0	2	18	9.0	10	0	7
1997	SD	15	97	84	13	7.0	1	2	0	2	33	16.5	26	0	6
1998	SD	16	114	91	23	3.5	1	2	0	0	0	0.0	0	0	7
1999	SD	14	98	74	24	3.5	1	1	0	1	16	16.0	16	0	9
2000	SD	16	122	102	20	3.5	1	0	0	2	2	1.0	2	0	11
2001	SD	16	94	83	11	1.0	2	0	0	1	2	2.0	2	0	6
2002	SD	13	83	59	24	1.5	1	0	0	1	25	25.0	25	0	7
2003	MIA	15	96	66	30	3.0	0	0	0	0	0	0.0	0	0	3
2004	MIA	8	57	31	26	1.0	0	1	0	0	0	0.0	0	0	1
2005	MIA	7	36	18	18	1.0	0	0	0	0	0	0.0	0	0	1
2006	NE	11	69	39	30	1.0	0	0	0	0	0	0.0	0	0	1
2007	NE	16	74	58	16	3.5	0	0	0	3	28	9.3	23	0	4
2008	NE	4	22	15	7	0.0	0	0	0	0	0	0.0	0	0	0
2009	NE	7	14	9	5	0.0	0	1	0	0	0	0.0	0	0	0
Career		268	1,846	1,436	410	56.5	12	18	0	18	238	13.2	42	1	98

== Beyond football ==
His restaurant at Westfield Mission Valley in Mission Valley, California—Seau's The Restaurant, which opened in 1996—was his most successful business venture. Seau also had a clothing line, Say Ow Gear. The restaurant was closed on May 16, 2012, just two weeks after his death; the trustees of his estate explained that "Without Seau's charismatic leadership, it was felt that the future profitability of the restaurant could be in question."

Sports Jobs with Junior Seau premiered on December 2, 2009, on Versus. The show followed Seau as he did the jobs that make sports work. Ten episodes aired through January 27, 2010.

Seau was actively involved with community work through Samoan "sister city" projects within San Diego County.

=== Junior Seau Foundation ===
In 1992, Seau created the Junior Seau Foundation with the mission to educate and empower young people through the support of child abuse prevention, drug and alcohol awareness, recreational opportunities, anti-juvenile delinquency efforts and complementary educational programs.

The 20th Anniversary Junior Seau Celebrity Golf Classic was held March 10–12, 2012, at the La Costa Resort and Spa.

The Foundation gave out an annual award to the individual who exemplifies the mission statement of the Junior Seau Foundation.

- 2000 — Legend of the Year — Sid Brooks
- 2001 — Legend of the Year — Lance Alworth
- 2002 — Legend of the Year — Sid Gillman
- 2003 — Legend of the Year — Don Coryell
- 2004 — Legend of the Year — Marcus Allen
- 2005 — Legend of the Year — Deacon Jones
- 2006 — Legend of the Year — Bobby Ross
- 2007 — Legend of the Year — Warren Moon
- 2008 — Legend of the Year — Marshall Faulk
- 2009 — Legend of the Year — Charlie Joiner
- 2010 — Legend of the Year — John Lynch
- 2011 — Legend of the Year — Bill Walton

== Personal life ==
In 1989, Seau's older son, Tyler, was born to Seau's high school sweetheart, Melissa Waldrop. Seau broke up with Waldrop when Tyler was 13 months old. He married Gina Deboer in 1991. The couple had three children together, a daughter and two sons, before divorcing in 2002. Seau's son Jake attended Duke University where he played lacrosse. In 2019, Jake signed with the Dallas Rattlers of Major League Lacrosse.

Seau sustained minor injuries in October 2010 when his SUV plunged down a 100-foot cliff in Carlsbad, California, only hours after he was arrested for domestic violence following an incident reported to the police by his girlfriend at their home in nearby Oceanside. Seau stated that he fell asleep at the wheel, and was never charged in the domestic incident.

Seau's nephew, Ian Seau, was also a football player. Another nephew, Micah Seau, played football at San Diego State. His cousin was Pulu Poumele.

== Death ==
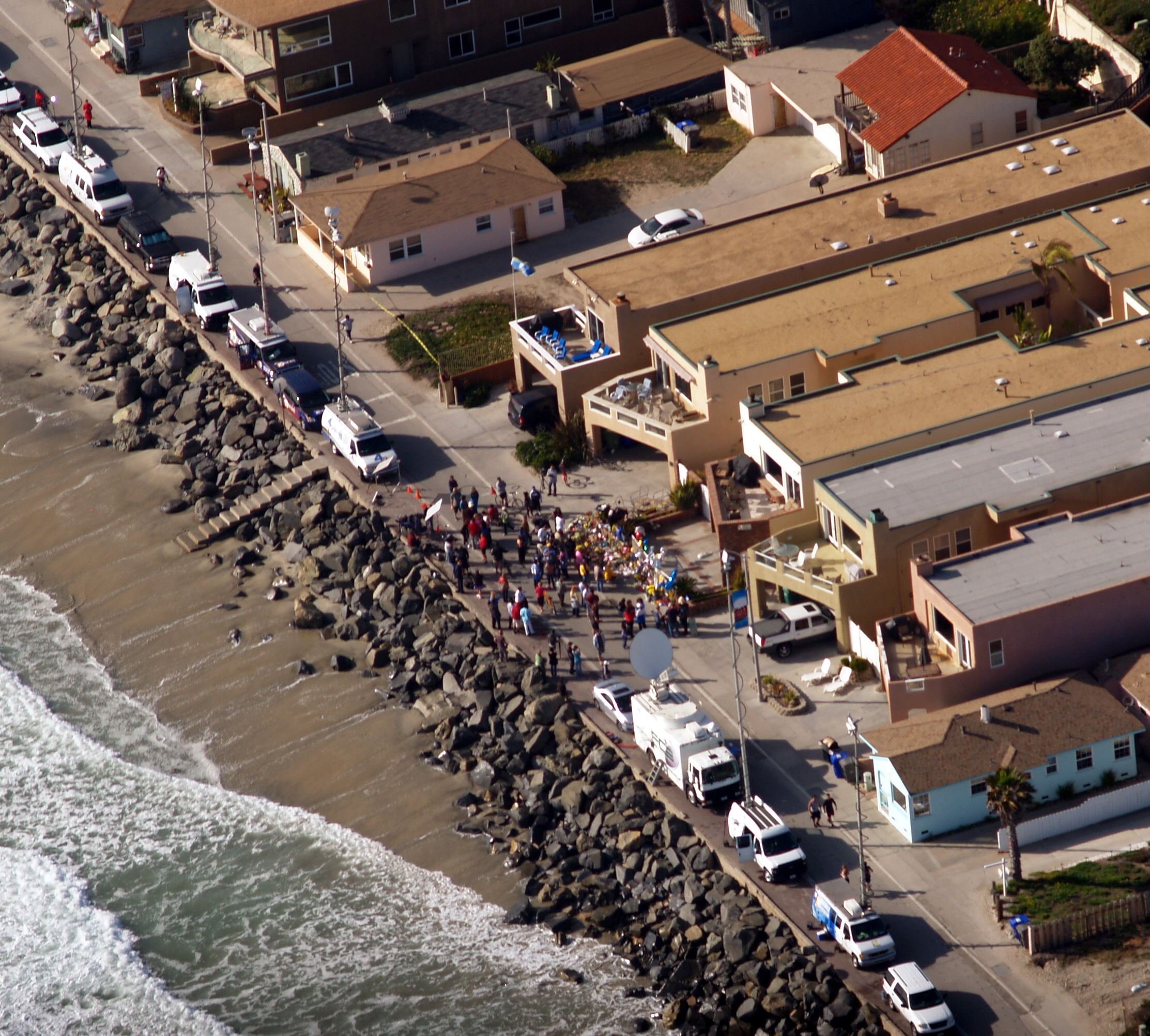
Media and fans at a memorial outside Seau's house the day after his suicide

On May 2, 2012, Seau was found dead with a gunshot wound to the chest at his home in Oceanside. Authorities ruled his death a suicide. He left no suicide note, but did leave a piece of paper in the kitchen of his home with lyrics he scribbled from his favorite country song, "Who I Ain't." The song, co-written by his friend Jamie Paulin, describes a man who regrets the person he has become.

Seau's death recalled the 2011 suicide of former NFL player Dave Duerson, who shot himself in the chest and left a suicide note requesting that his brain be studied for brain trauma. Seau had no prior reported history of concussions, but his ex-wife said he did sustain concussions during his career. "He always bounced back and kept on playing," Gina Seau said. "He's a warrior. That didn't stop him." Seau had insomnia for at least the last seven years of his life, and he was taking zolpidem (Ambien), a prescription drug commonly prescribed for sleep disorders.

Seau's autopsy report released later in August 2012 by the San Diego County medical examiner indicated that his body contained no illegal drugs or alcohol, but did show traces of zolpidem. No apparent signs of brain damage were found, nor was he determined to have exhibited mood changes and irritability often apparent with concussions and brain damage.

There was speculation that Seau suffered brain damage due to CTE, a condition traced to concussion-related brain damage with depression as a symptom, as dozens of deceased former NFL players were found to have CTE. Seau's family donated his brain tissue to the National Institute of Neurological Disorders and Stroke, part of the NIH; other candidates included the Center for the Study of Traumatic Encephalopathy and the Brain Injury Research Institute. Citing the Seau family's right to privacy, NIH did not intend to release the findings.

On January 10, 2013, Seau's family released the NIH's findings that his brain showed definitive signs of CTE. Russell Lonser of the NIH coordinated with three independent neuropathologists, giving them unidentified tissue from three brains, including Seau's. The three experts - along with two government researchers - arrived at the same conclusion. The NIH said the findings on Seau were similar to autopsies of people "with exposure to repetitive head injuries."

On January 23, 2013, Seau's family sued the NFL over the brain injuries he had over his career. In 2014, his family continued to pursue the lawsuit while opting out of the NFL concussion lawsuit's proposed settlement, which was initially funded with $765 million. The family reached a confidential settlement with the league in 2018. The Seaus' attorney said that they were "pleased" with the resolution.

Seau is one of at least 345 NFL players to be diagnosed after death with chronic traumatic encephalopathy (CTE), which is caused by repeated hits to the head.

== Legacy ==
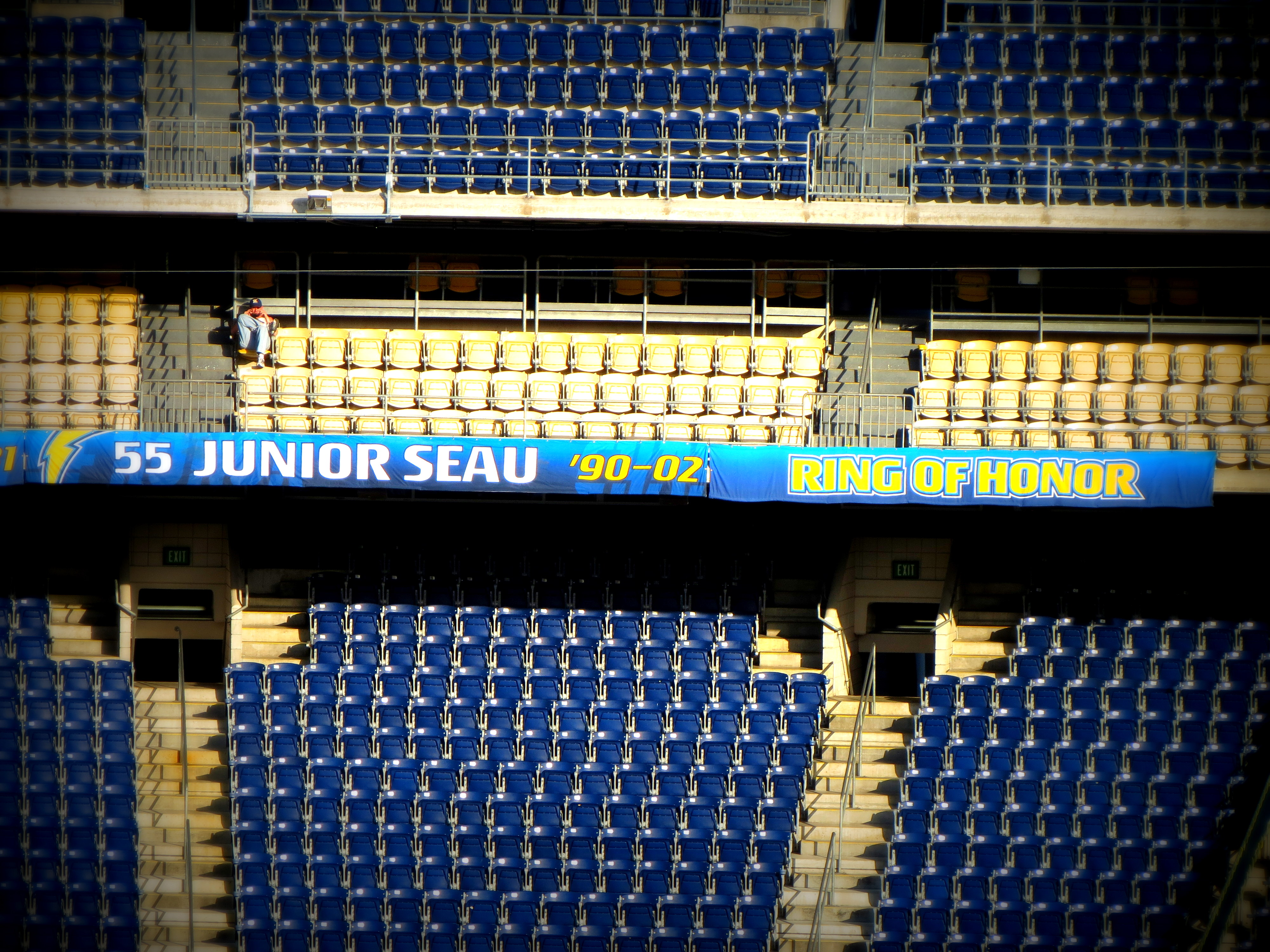
Seau honored at the Chargers Ring of Honor

Seau was known for his passionate playing style, including a fist-pumping dance he performed after big plays. Rick Gosselin of The Dallas Morning News said Seau "probably was the most dynamic player of his era". NFL head coach Norv Turner, who coached Seau as well as faced him as an opponent, said, "The No. 1 thing about Junior was that he was such an explosive player he'd defeat one-on-one blocks and he was a great tackler."

Seau's quickness allowed him to freelance, which sometimes put him out of position. "People say he gambled a bit, but in reality, his insight led him to the ball ... Even when he was wrong, you had to account for him and that created problems for offensive coordinators. You'd better have somebody blocking him," said former NFL coach Tom Bass.

He was praised by teammates for his work ethic and leadership. He would play when hurt, and often refused to leave games. "He played the game the way it was meant to be played," said retired Denver Broncos quarterback John Elway. Bill Belichick, his coach at New England, praised Seau's leadership and willingness to accept any role.

He was named to the Chargers 40th and 50th anniversary teams, which honor the top players and coaches in the team's history. He was inducted into the San Diego Chargers Hall of Fame on November 27, 2011, as part of Alumni Day ceremonies at a sold-out game against the Denver Broncos at Qualcomm Stadium. Fellow Chargers Hall of Famer Dan Fouts introduced Seau before a crowd of nearly 71,000.

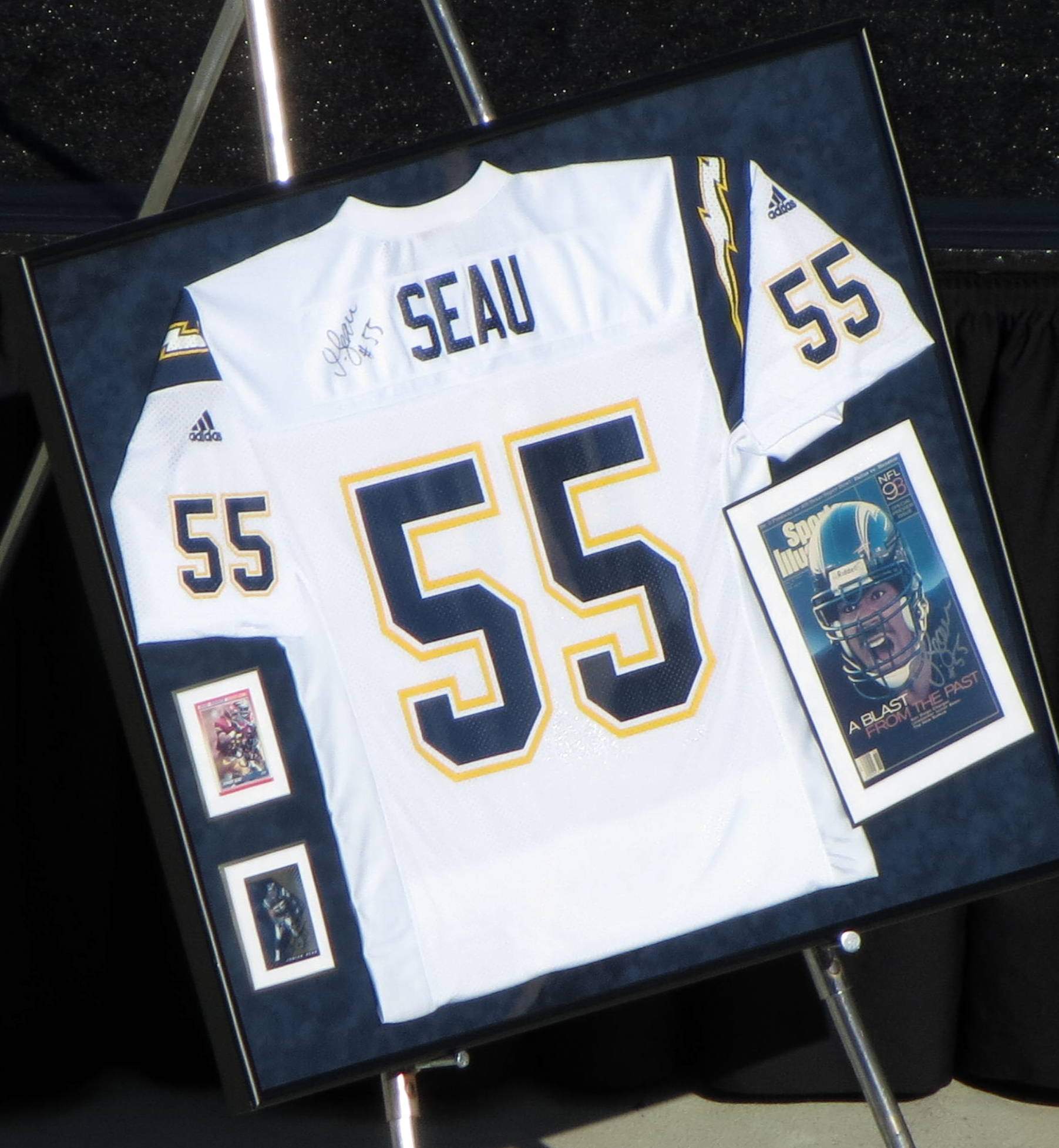
Seau's jersey was retired by the San Diego Chargers, where he played 13 seasons

Chargers President Dean Spanos honored Seau after his death as "...An icon in our community. He transcended the game. He wasn't just a football player, he was so much more." The Chargers retired his No. 55 during his public memorial. The Junior Seau Pier Amphitheatre and Junior Seau Beach Community Center were renamed posthumously in his honor by the city of Oceanside in July 2012.

On September 1, 2012, during the University of Southern California's home opener, Seau was honored by the team. On September 16, 2012, the Chargers retired Seau's number 55 during a ceremony at the 2012 regular season home opener against the Tennessee Titans. The San Diego Hall of Champions inducted Seau into the Breitbard Hall of Fame on February 25, 2013, forgoing their normal two-year waiting period after an athlete's retirement or death.

Seau became eligible for election into the Pro Football Hall of Fame in 2015. His eligibility was not accelerated due to his death from the standard five-year waiting period after a player's retirement. On January 31, 2015, Seau was elected to the Pro Football Hall of Fame. He wanted his daughter, Sydney, to introduce him if he were ever to be inducted. However, the Hall of Fame cited a five-year policy of not allowing speeches for deceased inductees, denying Sydney the opportunity to introduce her father.

Instead, she was allowed to speak onstage for three minutes uninterrupted on the NFL Network, and delivered a pared down version of her full speech, which The New York Times published. Seau is the first player of Polynesian and Samoan descent to be inducted into the Hall of Fame.

On September 21, 2018, ESPN released Seau, a 30 for 30 documentary that highlighted Seau's career, as well as the effects of his injuries on his life, his family, and his post-football endeavors.

On August 5, 2023, Junior Seau's linebacker teammate in Miami for three years, Zach Thomas, paid tribute to him at the end of his Pro Football Hall of Fame speech: "But there's one person whose name I've yet to mention. His poster hung on my wall in college, and he was everything I wanted to be as a football player. He was my inspiration, and he became my teammate and friend. Though he's not here physically, he's here in spirit and in a bust in that building behind me. I'm truly honored to join him. Junior Seau, love ya buddy."

== See also ==
- List of Pro Football Hall of Fame inductees
- List of suicides
- List of NFL players with chronic traumatic encephalopathy
