= Stuff Happens (TV series) =

- Starring: Bill Nye

Original release
- Network: Planet Green
- Release: August 25 – December 16, 2008

Stuff Happens is a 2008 television show starring Bill Nye airing on Planet Green. The show discusses how everyday activities can have a negative impact on the environment and encourages viewers to make choices that are less harmful to the environment.

== Premise ==
In each episode, Bill Nye explains how our everyday activities affect the environment. Every episode focuses on a different aspect of life including breakfast, lunch, dinner, adult activities in the bedroom, and the office.

== Cast and crew ==
Name	Job
Bill Nye	Himself - Host
Joseph Bruce	Consultant of magnetic studies
Leslie Durso	Leslie the Lab Girl
Manuel Oteyza	Series Producer
Jason Brett Klein	Series original music
Steve Barton	Sound Re-recording mixer
James Fielden	Sound Re-recording mixer
William Komar	Sound Re-recording mixer
Colin Feist	Digital compositor
Jason Brett Klein	Title theme composer

== International broadcast ==
The series premieres on 7 June 2015 in Australia on Discovery Science.
