= Dennis Nikrasch =

American locksmith

Dennis Nikrasch (September 12, 1941 – 2010), also known by the alias of Dennis McAndrew, was a Vegas slot cheater and a former locksmith who was responsible for spearheading the biggest casino theft in Las Vegas history, by grabbing $16,000,000 from rigging slot machines over a 22-year period. His career began in Chicago, Illinois, as a locksmith. He then found out that he could break into any lock he wished, due to his extensive knowledge of the tools, and became associated with members from a key Chicago crime family until his arrest in 1961. When he was released in 1970, he realized that he could make even bigger profits by manipulating slot machines in Las Vegas. From 1976 until 1983, he obtained $10 million from this method. He was then found in 1986 and sentenced to five years in prison. He was released in 1991, but he didn't return to Vegas headlines until 1996, when he returned, this time with a new approach in response to the higher levels of security. He actually managed to keep his cheating secret until November 1998, when one of his accomplices revealed information about his cheating machines. He was arrested and sentenced to 7.5 years in prison, being released in 2004. He died in 2010 from unknown causes at the age of either 68 or 69.

== Cheating Vegas ==
The television show 'Cheating Vegas', Season One, Episode Three, The Casino Chip Forgers Who Scammed Vegas For Millions, can be found on YouTube, and includes a video biography of Nikrasch and his associates, and his 22 years career cheating slot machines, and getting caught, primarily in the Las Vegas area.
