= Babe Winkelman =

American sportsman and television producer

- Born: April 24, 1949 (age 77)
- Known for: Television producer, host of Good Fishing and Outdoor Secrets
- Spouse: Kristeen Winkelman
- Children: Amanda; Jasmine; Donielle; Mackenzie; Karlee
- Website: http://www.winkelman.com

Babe Winkelman (born April 24, 1949) is an American sportsman and television producer, known for television programs about hunting and fishing. His program Good Fishing was first syndicated internationally in the mid-1980s. As of 2017, Winkelman produces an additional program, Outdoor Secrets, which with Good Fishing, airs in the United States and internationally on channels such as CBS Sports, American Hero Channel, and Destination America. His programs are also available globally on 25,000 hyper-local websites across the U.S. and Roku, Apple TV, Opera TV, Amazon Fire, and Netflix.

== Early life ==
Donald Edward "Babe" Winkelman (nicknamed by his father after baseball giant Babe Ruth) grew up on a dairy farm near the small town of Duelm, Minnesota. He started fishing at age 6 on Stoney Brook, a stream that ran through the family farm. It was there that he started to understand how fish moved around through the seasons and there that his "Pattern Approach" to fishing got its roots. Pheasants were abundant on the farm as well and his hunting career started there with his first pheasant kill at age 8. Deer hunting started as a driver at age 10 and he shot his first buck at age 12.

Through endless hours of hunting and fishing, Babe polished his skills. During the 1960s, Babe spent a lot of time at the family cabin on Hay Lake near Longville, where he refined his "pattern" approach to fishing that he continues to teach others today. He started working construction after graduating eighth grade and continued learning carpentry throughout high school. He learned from his father, Don Winkelman Sr., who was a carpentry master. Less than two months after graduating high school, he became the youngest person in the history of Minnesota to get his journeyman's Union card. Babe spent his nights playing lead guitar and singing in bands. In May 1969, he started Winkelman Building Corporation Inc., a construction company, along with his brother Dennis and father Don. In February 1970, Johnny Winter called him 3 times for him to go on a world tour as lead guitarist for his band. He decided he couldn't leave his dad and the construction business, and his music career became a hobby that he still practices to this day. By the time Babe was 25, the company had grown into 6 corporations with nearly 200 employees. Babe decided his interests were elsewhere, and he embarked on a full-time career in the outdoors.

== Outdoor life ==
He started guiding fishermen in 1965 and started fishing tournaments in 1970. In 1973, he helped found the Minnesota State Bass Federation to get bass tournaments started and served as president for nearly 3 years. 1973 was also the year Babe started writing for outdoor publications and gave his first seminar to teach fishing. Babe started in the outdoors full-time in 1975, where he guided, fished tournaments, taught at seminars, and did promotional work for Lindy/Little Joe Fishing Tackle. He became a field editor for Fishing Facts magazine, writing for them and a host of other publications.

In the last four decades, Babe has written many articles and has guest hosted hundreds of radio shows and podcast episodes. In 1978, he was hired by S.C. Johnson to introduce a new product to America, "Deep Woods OFF." The commercial was Babe, "as a professional fisherman", needing a stronger insect repellent because of his outdoor endeavors. Babe's fishing television series, Good Fishing, first hit the airwaves in 1980. This prompted him to start Babe Winkelman Productions Inc. and set up his own studio. For nearly 40 years he has owned the trademark,"Teaching America to Fish." The show was educational and involved his whole family. The show kept growing in size and covered the U.S. and Canada. During the 1980s, Babe authored a series of "how to" books on fishing, was the only person to use audio tapes to teach fishing, was the first to develop videos that taught fishing starting in 1984, and went on to produce nearly 100 different titles in the next decade.

== Appearances ==
The Saturday Evening Post ran a feature on Babe in 1987. He was also featured in People Magazine in 1988, Midwest Living around 1990, and thousands of other newspaper and magazine articles, radio, and TV appearances. Excerpts of Good Fishing appeared three times on Married... with Children and about a dozen different movies. Babe was also a guest on Donny & Marie. 1988 was also the year Babe aired his second television series, Outdoor Secrets (hunting series), which was the first hunting show on the air since 1978. Winkelman spoke at a presidential rally for President George W. Bush in 2004.

== Awards ==
In 1988, Babe was inducted into the Fresh Water Fishing Hall of Fame. In 1992, he was inducted into the Sports Legends Hall of Fame alongside professional boxer Evander Holyfield, baseball player Pete Rose, and 30 other athletes from around the world. Babe is the only outdoorsman ever to be inducted into this hall of fame. In 2001, he was inducted into the Fishing Hall of Fame of Minnesota. In 2007, he was given the Excellence in Craft award by the Outdoor Writers Association of America (OWAA), their most prestigious award for his work with television. Babe Winkelman's production company has won a couple hundred awards for production excellence, including 87 in a two-year span. This included the New York Film Festival, the WorldFest-Houston International Film Festival (for a commercial), and production awards including the Teddy, Addy, and the Golden Moose Awards. In 2013, Babe and Kris were nominated by Otter Tail County as Conservationists of the Year for the state of Minnesota. The award recognized the work they have done at some land they bought for hunting with the whole family in 2002 and turned it into a wilderness paradise. In 2015, Babe was inducted into the Legends of the Outdoors National Hall of Fame.
