= Sports Jobs with Junior Seau =

Television series

Sports Jobs with Junior Seau was a television reality program/documentary series on Versus hosted by retired National Football League player Junior Seau. The program premiered on December 2, 2009; the final episode ran on January 27, 2010.

The program depicted Seau exploring a variety of support and behind-the-scenes jobs in the sports industry. The program was produced by Mandt Bros. Productions.

== Episodes ==
1. Giants Stadium Construction Crew
2. Dodgers Batboy
3. Washington Capitals Equipment Manager
4. TD Garden Arena Conversion Team
5. Indycar Pit Crew Member
6. LPGA Caddy
7. Sports Illustrated Reporter
8. UFC Cornerman
9. Horse Trainer
10. PBR Bull Fighter
