= Destination America =

American television channel

- Country: United States
- Broadcast area: Nationwide
- Affiliates: Discovery+ HBO Max
- Headquarters: Silver Spring, Maryland

Programming
- Language: English
- Picture format: 1080i HDTV (downscaled to letterboxed 480i for the SDTV feed)

Ownership
- Owner: Skydance Corporation
- Sister channels: see list of assets owned by Skydance Corporation

History
- Launched: October 7, 1996; 30 years ago
- Former names: Living (prelaunch, 1994–1996); Discovery Travel & Living Network (1996–1998); Discovery Home and Leisure (1998); Discovery Home & Leisure Channel (1998–2004); Discovery Home Channel (2004–2008); Planet Green (2008–2012)

Links
- Website: www.destinationamerica.com

Availability

Streaming media
- Affiliated Steaming Service: Discovery+ HBO Max
- Service(s): DirecTV Stream, Hulu + Live TV, Philo, Sling TV, Vidgo TV

Destination America is an American cable television channel owned by Skydance Corporation. The network carries programming focused on the culture of the United States—including food, lifestyles, and travel.

As of November 2023, Destination America is available to approximately 23,000,000 pay television households in the United States-down from its 2013 peak of 60,000,000 households. After the merger of Discovery, Inc. and WarnerMedia, in 2021, along with American Heroes Channel, Boomerang, Cooking Channel, Discovery Family, Discovery Life, and Science Channel, Destination America became one of over 100 channels in the Warner Bros. Discovery portfolio.

In recent years, Destination America has lost carriage with the growth of streaming alternatives including its parent company's HBO Max, and has generally been depreciated by Warner Bros. Discovery in current retransmission consent negotiations with cable and streaming providers.

== History ==
The network was originally one of four digital cable networks launched by Discovery Communications in 1996. The new networks were first announced in November 1994, with a launch planned for Spring 1995. At the time, the network had the working title Living and was described as "a home repair network". The launch was delayed, and the channel made its debut in October 1996, originally known as Discovery Travel & Living Network and offering programming including do-it-yourself projects, cooking, interior design and landscaping, and party planning.

By 1998, it had settled on the name Discovery Home & Leisure, but the "Leisure" part of the name was dropped on March 29, 2004, when the channel became Discovery Home Channel. Much of the travel-related programming was dropped in the process to provide more focus on home improvement and cooking.

=== Planet Green ===
Planet Green logo used from June 4, 2008, to May 25, 2012; the circle was later changed to dark red in 2010.

In April 2007, during its upfronts, Discovery announced that Discovery Home would re-launch in 2008 as a new channel focused on environmentalism and sustainable living as part of the growing trend of public awareness on global warming, climate change, and other environmental issues. The channel itself was announced as part of a $50 million corporate initiative known as "Planet Green", undertaken under Discovery's new CEO David Zaslav, which would include the production of programming on other Discovery channels (such as the Discovery Channel series Ten Ways to Save the Planet) that appeal to these themes, an "innovation conference", and making its headquarters carbon neutral. Zaslav stated that Discovery Home had been economically sound, but wasn't "serving this higher purpose". On August 1, 2007, Discovery announced its acquisition of TreeHugger, a blog focusing on sustainable living. The site was to be positioned as a digital companion to the new channel.

In October 2007, Discovery hired veteran producer Andy Friendly as a consultant for Planet Green's programming, and to executive produce a series for the channel. The new series, Supper Club, was announced in January 2008, and would be hosted by Tom Bergeron (whom Friendly had helped cast as host for the 1998 syndicated version of Hollywood Squares).

Further programming details were announced in Discovery's April 2008 upfronts, including specials hosted by NBC News correspondent Tom Brokaw, the reality show Battleground Earth with Ludacris and Tommy Lee, Emeril Green, Hollywood Green with Maria Menounos, and the Bill Nye-hosted Stuff Happens, among other series. It was announced that the network would launch on June 4, 2008, and that a "sneak peek" of the network's programming would become available via video on demand on April 17. Later that month, Planet Green ordered Focus Earth, a weekly environmental newsmagazine produced by ABC News and hosted by Bob Woodruff.

Planet Green was one of the two highly anticipated Discovery network re-launches spearheaded by Zaslav, the other being the Oprah Winfrey Network—a relaunch of Discovery Health that was ultimately delayed to January 2011.

Despite high expectations, the network's launch was unsuccessful; writing for NPR, Mark Hemingway observed that besides Focus Earth and Stuff Happens (praising the former as being "informative and shockingly fair to business interests"), the majority of Planet Green's programs lacked entertainment value, and gave an impression that the network's purpose was encouraging viewers to "join a club whose rules are dogmatic and whose dues are absurdly high" (noting its renovation programs often requiring expensive materials and components to achieve their environmental goals, and that Emeril Green was "indistinguishable from much of what's already on the Food Network" albeit with an emphasis on 'buying local").

By March 2010, Planet Green's programming had broadened to include programs unrelated to its original concept, such as The Fabulous Beekman Boys. In February 2011, Discovery Communications executives were acknowledging the channel's failure. Zaslav stated in a conference call with investors that Discovery "can probably do something else with that that would be more meaningful." Shortly thereafter the channel had abandoned its theme, rerunning programs from other Discovery Communications channels and featuring programming blocks such as "Paranormal Fridays". Discovery announced a probable rebranding of the channel by the start of the summer of 2012.

=== Destination America ===
Destination America logo used from May 26, 2012, to March 15, 2015

On April 4, 2012, Discovery announced through the early release of an article in USA Today that Planet Green would be re-branded as Destination America, a network focusing primarily on cuisine, natural history, and travel programming, appealing primarily towards Middle America. The launch lineup also featured programs that had previously aired on Travel Channel before its sale to Cox Communications. The channel was originally expected to have a Memorial Day launch on May 28, 2012.

In 2015, the network began to experiment with professional wrestling by picking up TNA programming (which had recently been dropped by Spike), including its flagship weekly program Impact Wrestling. Later that year, the network also announced that it had signed a 26-week television deal for Ring of Honor's weekly show, Ring of Honor Wrestling, which would begin on June 3, 2015. Impact moved to Pop in January 2016.

The network also began to increase its focus on programs dealing with paranormal topics and investigations; on October 30, 2015, it aired Exorcism Live—a live special broadcast from the St. Louis site of the exorcism of Roland Doe, featuring the cast of Ghost Asylum and Chip Coffey. The March 4, 2016 premiere of Paranormal Lockdown was among the highest-rated series premieres in the channel's history, which prompted further growth in the channel's focus on paranormal series. Destination America underwent a rebranding in 2017, with on-air presentation carrying a darker and "uneasy" atmosphere (including a signature "glitch" effect) to reflect its change in programming direction.

Discovery's 2018 acquisition of Scripps Networks Interactive brought Travel Channel back under its ownership; a rebranding of Travel Channel in October 2018 repositioned the network to focus more on paranormal programming. Since then, Destination America's schedule has largely shifted back towards its original format, drawing from Discovery and SNI's program libraries.

== Programming ==
=== Planet Green ===
Planet Green programming included ecologically themed shows built around celebrities including Ed Begley Jr., Emeril Lagasse, Adrian Grenier, Leonardo DiCaprio, Ludacris, Tommy Lee, Tom Bergeron, SuChin Pak, Maria Menounos, Bob Woodruff, and Discovery Channel producer Tom Golden. In addition, celebrities gave 'green' tips within network bumpers that transitioned into and out of commercial breaks. The channel was programmed in eight-hour blocks, which repeated three times per day until April 2010. Lacking separate satellite feeds for the East and West coasts of the United States, prime-time programs ran from 8 p.m. to 11 p.m. Eastern Time and were then repeated.

Shows previously seen on Planet Green include:

^{1} originally shown on Discovery Channel
^{2} originally shown on Animal Planet
^{3} originally shown on TLC
^{4} originally shown on FX

- A Haunting^{1}
- Airplane Repo
- Alter Eco
- Blood Sweat and T-Shirts
- Born Dealers
- Coastwatch
- Cool Fuel
- Dean of Invention
- Dresscue Me
- Emeril Green
- The Fabulous Beekman Boys
- Famous, Rich and Homeless
- Fast Forward
- Future Food
- G Word
- Go for the Green
- Gutted
- In Search of Perfection
- Living with Ed
- Operation Wild
- Planet Mechanics
- Prehistoric^{1}
- Renovation Nation
- Stuff Happens
- The Manic Organic
- Total Wrecklamation
- Treehugger TV
- Wa$ted!^{3}
- What Sank Titanic? ^{1}

=== Former programming ===
- Alaska Haunting: Dead of Winter
- Alaska Monsters
- Alaska Monsters: Bigfoot Edition
- Alaska Wildlife Troopers
- Alaska: The Last Frontier
- Alien Mysteries
- Aliens on the Moon
- America: Facts vs. Fiction
- America's Most Haunted Asylum
- American Factory
- American Loggers^{1}
- Amish Haunting
- Armageddon Arsenals
- Auction Kings
- Babe Winkelman's Outdoor Secrets
- Babies, Babies, Babies
- BBQ Pitmasters
- BBQ Pitmasters: Father vs. Son
- BBQ Pit Wars
- Beach Hunters
- Big Beach Builds
- Bill Dance Outdoors
- Buying Alaska
- Buying Hawaii
- Buying the Bayou
- Buying the Beach
- Buying Rockies
- Buying the Yukon
- Carnival Eats
- Cheating Vegas
- Chopped Junior
- Crikey! It's the Irwins^{2}
- The Demon Files
- Destroyed in Seconds^{1}
- Disney's Animal Kingdom
- Disney Cruise Line: Behind the Magic
- Disneyland Resort: Behind the Scenes
- Epic Homes
- Epic Log Homes
- Evil Things
- Exorcism: Live!
- The Exorcist File: Haunted Boy
- Expedition Unknown
- Extreme Homes
- Fact or Faked: Paranormal Files
- Fast Food Mania
- Flip That House
- Food Factory
- Ghost Asylum
- Ghost Brothers
- Ghosts in My House
- Ghosts of Shepherdstown
- Ghost Stalkers
- Haunted Case Files
- The Haunted: Death Rises
- Haunted Towns
- A Haunting
- Hauntings and Horrors
- Helltown
- Hometime
- Hidden in America
- Hooked on the Palm Beaches
- House Hunters Family
- How the Universe Works^{1}
- Impact Wrestling: Unlocked
- Incredible Inventions
- Kids Baking Championship
- Killing Bigfoot
- Kindred Spirits
- Lakefront Bargain Hunt
- Last Call Food Brawl
- Little People, Big World ^{3}
- Log Cabin Living
- Maine Cabin Masters
- Man, Fire, Food
- Man vs. Bear
- Man's Greatest Food
- Mega Engineering
- Mighty Ships
- Monsters and Mysteries in America
- Monsters and Mysteries Unsolved
- Moonshiners^{1}
- Mountain Monsters
- MythBusters Jr.
- On Location
- OutDaughtered
- Paranormal Lockdown
- Paranormal Lockdown UK
- Passport to the Palm Beaches
- Pool Kings
- Project Afterlife
- Railroad Alaska
- Ring of Honor Wrestling
- Road Trip Masters
- The Scott Martin Challenge
- Steak Out with Kix Brooks
- Swamp Loggers^{1}
- These Woods are Haunted
- Tiny House Big Living
- Tiny Luxury
- TNA: Impact Wrestling
- Too Cute^{2}
- The Treehouse Guys
- UFOs Over Earth
- UFOs: The Untold Stories
- UFOs: Uncovering the Truth
- Ultimate Walt Disney World
- United States of Bacon
- Walt Disney World Resort: Behind the Scenes
- What History Forgot
- When Ghosts Attack
- Wild Food
- The World's Strangest UFO Stories
- Xtreme Waterparks
- The Zoo^{2}
