= Fenwick Hall =

Historic house in South Carolina, United States

- U.S. National Register of Historic Places
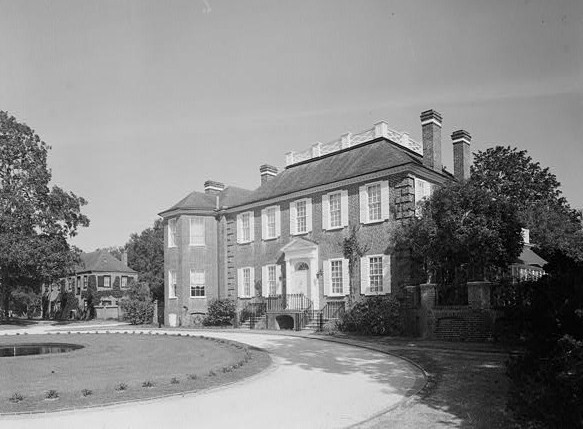
- Fenwick Hall

- Location within South Carolina Location within the United States
- Nearest city: Charleston, South Carolina
- Coordinates: 32°45′3″N 80°2′20″W
- Built: 1730
- Architectural style: Georgian
- NRHP reference No.: 72001196
- Added to NRHP: February 23, 1972

The Fenwick Hall, which is also known as Fenwick Castle, is a plantation house built about 1730 on Johns Island, South Carolina, across the Stono River from James Island and Charleston. It is located between River Road and Penneys Creek. It was named to the National Register of Historic Places on February 23, 1972.

== History ==
John Fenwick, a brother of the former privateer Robert Fenwick, was from a county family in England. He acquired the plantation on the Stono River by 1721. In 1730, he built the central, rectangular portion of the house.

His son, Edward Fenwick, inherited the plantation about 1750. He constructed a carriage house to the west and a stable to the east of the house. He imported and bred English thoroughbred horses for racing. He built a 3 mi (4.8 km) track nearby under the current Maybank Highway. During this period, the plantation was called John's Island Stud as described in Harrison Fairfax's book of the same name. Since Fenwick was a Tory in the Revolutionary War, the property was confiscated. Some of it was returned by legislation in 1785.

In 1787, the plantation was sold to Fenwick's cousin John Gibbes. At this time, the octagonal wing was added. Daniel J. Townsend bought the property in 1840. It stayed in his family until 1876.

By 1929, when the house was bought by Mr. and Mrs. Victor Morawetz from Burt Whilden, the house was in ruins. It was restored by Mr. and Mrs. Victor Morawetz with the assistance of the architects Simons and Lapham of Charleston. On May 18, 1938, Mr. Morawetz died, and the house was inherited by his wife who sold it to Mr. Claude Blanchard in 1943. The most recent sale of the house and property was in 2018.

== Architecture ==
It is a Georgian style, two-story brick house on a raised basement. The original section was about 40 ft (12 m) by 36 ft (11 m). The hip roof was topped with a balustraded deck. The brickwork was Flemish bond. The south elevation has reconstructed nine over nine lights with reconstructed shutters.

The rectangular section has five bays with a Huguenot floor plan. The south facade entrance comes into a three-bay drawing room on the left. There is a smaller two-bay parlor to the left. The central hall extends to stairs at the back. There is rear rooms on either side of the hallway. There is an entrance to the 1787 octagonal wing in the northwest corner of the parlor.

The 1787 two-story wing is eight-sided about 50 ft (15 m) by 18 ft (5 m). It has two rooms divided by a staircase.

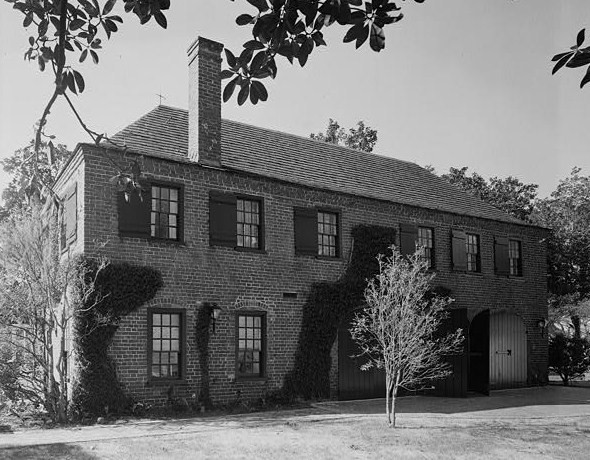
Fenwick Hall carriage house

The drawing room is plastered and has reproduction wallpaper. The other rooms on the first floor are wood paneled. There are seven bedrooms on the second floor. The four in the original section are wood paneled.

In the 1931 restoration, a veranda was added to the east and a small two-story wing on the west with a kitchen and bedroom and bath. A reconstructed simple entrance with pediment and two engaged Doric columns replaced a portico that was added in 1787.

Over forty additional pictures of the interior and exterior are available. A floor plan, architectural drawings, and more photographs are also available. A watercolor of Fenwick Hall prior to restoration is at the Greenville County Museum of Art.

The two-story brick coach house toward the west has been turned into a garage. A similar stable on the east no longer exists. A formal 18th-century garden was laid out in the 1931 restoration.

== See also ==
- National Register of Historic Places listings in Charleston County, South Carolina
