= List of Ghost Hunters International episodes =

Television reality series

Ghost Hunters International (abbreviated as GHI) is a spin-off series of Ghost Hunters that aired on Syfy (formerly Sci-Fi). The series premiered on January 9, 2008 and ended on April 4, 2012. Like its parent series, GHI is a reality series that followed a team of paranormal investigators; whereas, the original series primarily covers only locations within the United States, the GHI team traveled around the world and documented some of the world's most legendary haunted locations.

== Series overview ==
Season	Episodes	Originally released	
Season	Episodes	First released	Last released
1	23	January 9, 2008	March 4, 2009
2	26	July 8, 2009	February 16, 2011
3	13	July 13, 2011	April 4, 2012

== Episodes ==
=== Season 1 (2008–09) ===
No. overall	No. in season	Title	Nation(s)	Location(s)	Original release date	U.S. viewers (millions)
1	1	"Chillingham Castle"	United Kingdom	Chillingham, England – Chillingham Castle Edinburgh, Scotland – Mary King's Close	January 9, 2008	2.898
In the chilling premiere episode, the team heads to England to unlock the mysteries behind the grisly 800-year history of Chillingham Castle, widely regarded as the most haunted castle in England.
2	2	"Evil Unearthed"	Italy United Kingdom	Turin, Italy – Lucedio Abbey Aberystwyth, Wales – Nanteos Mansion	January 16, 2008	N/A
In this episode, the team descends into the macabre depths of the Abbey at Lucedio, near Turin, Italy, to unlock the secrets behind the dark legends that make up the Abbey's lurid 1400-year history.
3	3	"Whispers From Beyond"	United Kingdom	Edinburgh, Scotland – The Ragged School Leicester, England – Belgrave Hall	January 23, 2008	N/A
The Ghost Hunters International team heads to an idyllic community in central England to investigate claims at the notorious Belgrave Hall.
4	4	"Haunted Village"	United Kingdom	Pluckley, England – The Black Horse Inn, Elvey Farm, and The Screaming Woods	January 30, 2008	N/A
In this episode, the team visits the Elvey Farm Hotel in Pluckley Village, England.
5	5	"Fortress of Fear"	Romania	Râșnov, Romania – Râșnov Citadel	February 6, 2008	N/A
The team treks high into the mountains of Romania to pay a visit to the Citadel Rasnov, a 13th century fortress that was built to provide protection and defense to the neighboring village below. The castle has been the subject of local legends for years, the most notorious of which tells the tale of two captured soldiers who died in a well on the castle grounds in which they had spent years living as captives.
6	6	"Headless Haunting"	Slovakia Germany	Slovakia – Orava Castle Germany – Reichenstein Castle	February 13, 2008	N/A
GHI visits a German fortress whose chambers are haunted by the spirit of a beheaded 13th Century nobleman. Then it's all off to Slovakia, where the team separates legends from facts in the dark halls of Orava Castle.
7	7	"Frankenstein's Castle"	Germany	Darmstadt, Germany – Frankenstein Castle	February 20, 2008	N/A
Macabre rumors of witchcraft, wandering spirits and grave-robbing give GHI and special guest investigator Josh Gates of "Destination Truth" plenty to dig into at the real Frankenstein's Castle in Germany.
8	8	"Larnach Castle"	New Zealand	Dunedin, New Zealand – Larnach Castle	July 9, 2008	2.400
In this episode, the team makes their way to what many believe is the most haunted site in New Zealand, Larnach Castle.
9	9	"Devil Dog"	New Zealand United Kingdom	Wellington, New Zealand – Opera House Gloucestershire, England – Woodchester Mansion	July 16, 2008	2.600
Join the Ghost Hunters International team for a night at the theatre as they visit Wellington, New Zealand's St. James Theatre and Opera House.
10	10	"Castle of the Damned"	Ireland United Kingdom	Tullamore, Ireland – Charleville Castle Samlesbury, England – Samlesbury Hall	July 23, 2008	N/A
The team travels to Ireland to explore the mysteries of the infamous Charleville Castle. From there the team visits Samlesbury Hall in Samlesbury, England.
11	11	"Shattered Spirit"	United Kingdom	Denbighshire, North Wales – Bodelwyddan Castle	July 30, 2008	N/A
The Ghost Hunters International team visits Bodelwyddan Castle in Rhyl, England. Shrouded in mystery and housing unidentified bones in its walls, the only thing certain about this castle is the presence of unexplained shadows and drifting figures through its long corridors.
12	12	"Hauntings of South Africa"	South Africa	KwaZulu-Natal, South Africa – Nottingham Road Hotel Cape Town, South Africa – Cape Town Castle	August 6, 2008	N/A
The itinerary: a hotel haunted by a dead prostitute, Nightmare Cave and a gruesome castle.
13	13	"Tortured Souls"	Slovenia Slovakia	Predjama, Slovenia – Predjama Castle Čachtice, Slovakia – Čachtice Castle	August 13, 2008	N/A
The first ever to investigate this ominous site, the team explores Slovenian national monument, the Predjama Castle. Once a refuge site for the Luegg family, the castle is now home to a museum. The current tenants are sure to lock up long before dusk as to avoid encountering the spirit of Robin-Hood-like Erasmus scurrying about, who is still trying to keep the castle stocked with food and supplies. The team then travels to another castle with a far more gruesome tale. The Bathory Ruins at Cachtice Castle in Slovenia are home to the final resting place of prolific and infamous serial killer Elizabeth Bathory.
14	14	"Dracula's Castle"	Romania	Transylvania, Romania – Bánffy Castle Curtea de Argeș, Romania – Dracula's Castle	August 20, 2008	2.300
Join the GHI team as they explore Romania's Banffy Castle. Commonly known as "The Versailles of Transylvania," the castle was home to the famous Banffy family. Despite the surrounding area being ripped apart by an ongoing war, Miklos Banffy refused to abandon his beloved home, and still makes his presence known today. Then the team travels to Poienari Castle to visit the residence of Vlad the Impaler, better known as the legendary Dracula.
15	15	"The Ghost Child of Peru"	Peru	Callao, Peru – Real Felipe Fortress	January 7, 2009	2.700
Watch as the team uncovers the truth behind the haunted Real Felipe Fortress, in Callao, Peru.
16	16	"City of the Doomed"	Brazil	Cambuquira, Brazil – Grande Hotel São Paulo, Brazil – The Little Castle	January 14, 2009	N/A
First, follow the team to the Grande Hotel in Cambuquira, Brazil. Legend has it that a local priest cursed the town that the hotel resides in. Then, join the Ghost Hunters team as they take a trip to Apa street's Little Castle. Fearful members of the surrounding community adamantly avoid the castle.
17	17	"A Call For Help"	Denmark Peru	Copenhagen, Denmark – Trekroner Fort Lima, Peru – Casa Garland	January 21, 2009	N/A
First, GHI dares to explore the Trekroner fort in Copenhagen, Denmark. Then, the team heads to the Jose Bonifacio Cultural Center in Rio De Janeiro, Brazil.
18	18	"Restless Souls of Sweden"	Sweden	Borgvattnet, Sweden – House of Priests Varberg, Sweden – Fortress of Varberg	January 28, 2009	N/A
Join the Ghost Hunters team as they investigate the Haunted Home of Priests in Borgvattnet, Sweden. Haunted activity has been heard in each room of the Vicarage, earning it its title as the most haunted Inn in Sweden. Then, follow the team to Varberg, Sweden, where they investigate the paranormal events surrounding the 800-year-old fortress of Varberg.
19	19	"Buried Alive"	Denmark Brazil	Dragsholm, Denmark – Dragsholm Castle Rio de Janeiro, Brazil – Cultural Center	February 4, 2009	N/A
The Ghost Hunters International team travels to Denmark, as they uncover the truth behind the paranormal activities at the Dragholm Castle. Then, join the team as they travel to Rio De Janeiro, Brazil to investigate the Jose Bonifacio Cultural Center.
20	20	"Unknown Soldiers"	Philippines	Angeles City – Clark Hospital Baguio, Philippines – Diplomat Hotel	February 11, 2009	N/A
The team sets out to investigate the paranormal stories surrounding the Clark Air Base Hospital in the Philippines. The Hospital was the final breathing grounds for many victims of the Vietnam War and World War II. Then, the crew travels to the fearsome Diplomat Hotel in Baguio, Philippines. Before it was reconstructed, the Diplomat Hotel was a home and hospital for World War II refugees.
21	21	"Spanish Scares"	Spain	Madrid, Spain – Castillo de la Coracera Celrà, Spain – Castel d'Escales	February 18, 2009	N/A
The Ghost Hunters head to Madrid, Spain where they investigate the frequent paranormal activity at the Castillo Coracera. Both Napoleon and Hitler's troops have been housed in this building and many died a torturous death on the site. Then, watch as the Ghost Hunters unravel the truth behind the mysterious legends surrounding the Castel d'Escales in Catalonia, Spain. The building has housed 1000 years of violent history, having sheltered many French and Jewish refugees during the genocide of the Cathars and Knights Templar.
22	22	"Ghosts in the City of Lights"	France	Bordeaux, France – Château Lagorce Paris, France – Capucins Quarries	February 25, 2009	N/A
Follow the team to Paris, France as they investigate the ancient tunnels that run underneath the town. The tunnels, which are also known as "les Carrieres de Paris", were once used for mining and are now believed to contain human remains. Then, the Ghost Hunters head to Haux, France, where they investigate the Chateau Lagorce, a home that has a horrific history and was used by the Nazis in World War II. The current residents of the estate have reported paranormal encounters in each of the 15 bedrooms.
23	23	"Karosta Prison"	Latvia	Liepāja, Latvia – Karostas Cietums	March 4, 2009	2.200
Join the GHI team in Liepaja, Latvia, as they investigate Karosta Cietums, a former military prison with a horrific history. The complex was once known as the prison that no one ever dared to escape from. Many prisoners were brutally tortured and murdered on the grounds. It is believed that now even the souls of the tortured victims are trapped inside.

=== Season 2 (2009–11) ===
No. overall	No. in season	Title	Nation(s)	Location(s)	Original release date	U.S. viewers (millions)
24	1	"Wicklow's Gaol"	Ireland	Wicklow, Ireland – Wicklow Gaol	July 8, 2009	N/A
The first episode of the season ventures deep into the countryside of Wicklow, Ireland for an investigation of an old 18th century prison. As these 'real-life ghost hunters' try to uncover truth or fiction, they'll face their closest supernatural encounter yet!
25	2	"Skeleton in the Closet"	Czech Republic United Kingdom	Bohemia, Czech Republic – Český Krumlov Rathlin Island, Northern Ireland – Manor House	July 15, 2009	N/A
GHI investigates the bones of a Catholic saint in the Czech Republic; the ghost of a landlord refuses to be exorcized in Northern Ireland.
26	3	"Gate to Hell"	Czech Republic	Blatce, Czech Republic – Houska Castle	July 22, 2009	N/A
Back in the Czech Republic, GHI investigates a castle reputed to have been built over the gate to Hell.
27	4	"Witches Castle"	Austria	Unternberg, Austria – Moosham Castle Spittal an der Drau, Austria – Schloss Porcia	July 29, 2009	N/A
GHI's first trip to Austria brings them to a five hundred year old torture chamber; the investigation of a royal palace is part ghost hunt, part treasure hunt.
28	5	"Spirits of Italy"	Italy	Fosdinovo, Italy – Malaspina Castle Genoa, Italy – Palazzo Ducale	August 5, 2009	N/A
Ghost Hunters International returns to Italy to investigate the Tuscan castle of Malaspina and its 700 year old legend of the doomed lover Bianca Maria Aloisia.
29	6	"Holy Ghosts"	Chile	El Bosque, Chile – El Bosque City Hall Valparaíso, Chile – Santiago Sevrin Library	August 12, 2009	N/A
The GHI team is bound for South America and arrive in Chile for two investigations. First stop - the famed El Bosque City Hall, which was once a retirement home for Catholic priests and doubled as a house of detention for the secret police during the reign of Augusto Pinochet. The team will also investigate the Santiago Severin Library, where the librarians are hearing noises they can't "shush" away.
30	7	"Hitler's Ghost"	Argentina	Miramar, Argentina – Gran Hotel Viena	January 6, 2010	2.626
The Ghost Hunters International team ventures to Miramar, Argentina and set their sites on the Gran Hotel Viena, once the secret residence of many Nazi war criminals including rumored guest, Adolf Hitler.
31	8	"Silver Shadow"	Argentina Australia	La Falda, Argentina – Eden Hotel Junee, Australia – Monte Cristo	January 13, 2010	N/A
Ghost Hunters International makes their way to La Falda, Argentina to uncover the ghostly mysteries of The Eden Hotel, a 19th century luxury resort which once welcomed the rich and the famous. The GHI team then ventures to Junee, Australia to visit the Monte Cristo Homestead, built in 1884 as a Victorian manor for a wealthy family. Unfortunately the manor has been plagued by many horrific incidents and deaths over the years.
32	9	"Quarantine Station"	Australia	Sydney, Australia – Quarantine Station	January 20, 2010	N/A
The GHI team ventures to Sydney, Australia and visits the Quarantine Station -- named Australia's most haunted area.
33	10	"Port Arthur Penitentiary"	Australia	Port Arthur, Tasmania – Port Arthur Penitentiary	January 27, 2010	N/A
GHI investigates the ruins of the Port Arthur Penal Colony in Tasmania, Australia. From 1830-1870, Port Arthur was the place they called "hell on earth," where the convicts of a past era lived and died.
34	11	"Tasmania Death Sentence"	Australia Malaysia	Hobart, Tasmania – Supreme Courthouse Batu Gajah, Malaysia – Kellie's Castle	February 3, 2010	N/A
Ghost Hunters International ventures to Hobart, Tasmania and investigates the Tasmania Supreme Courthouse.
35	12	"San Lucas Prison"	Costa Rica	San Lucas Island, Costa Rica – San Lucas Prison	February 10, 2010	N/A
The GHI team ventures to Costa Rica and investigates the San Lucas Penitentiary, an abandoned 19th century prison known as 'The Alcatraz' of Central America.
36	13	"The Legend of Rose Hall"	Costa Rica Jamaica	Cartago, Costa Rica – Duran Sanatorium Montego Bay, Jamaica – Rose Hall Great House	February 17, 2010	N/A
The GHI crew heads to Kingston, Jamaica and tries to shed light on the ghost of sugar plantation owner, Annie Palmer. Her cruel and often sadistic ways towards her slaves labeled her as the 'White Witch of Rose Hall.'
37	14	"The Spirit of Robin Hood"	United Kingdom	Nottingham, England – Galleries of Justice Museum	July 14, 2010	N/A
With passports and EMF detectors in hand, the team from Ghost Hunters International is back on the case. The crew heads to the Galleries of Justice, tucked away in Nottingham, England, a location historically notorious for its 123 documented public executions and undocumented torture of prisoners. Also, Ghost Hunters Academy graduates Karl Pfeiffer and Susan Slaughter officially join the GHI team. Will they be able to survive the jump into the big leagues, and successfully tackle the claims of haunting in the Galleries?
38	15	"Sweeney Todd"	United Kingdom	Port Talbot, Wales – Margam Castle Colnbrook, England – The Ostrich Inn	July 21, 2010	1.346
This week is a double-header, with the team starting at Margam Castle in Wales. Their next stop is the 900-year-old Ostrich Inn in England, which served as the inspiration for "Sweeney Todd". Former owners the Jarmans killed over 60 people by getting them drunk, putting them to bed, then dropping them through a trap door in the bed into a vat of boiling oil below.
39	16	"Wolf's Lair"	Poland	Kętrzyn, Poland – Wolf's Lair	July 28, 2010	1.494
The team from Ghost Hunters International embarks on one of their most expansive and dangerous investigations to date. The crew heads to Poland to visit the site of the infamous Valkyrie Bombing and command post of Adolf Hitler, Wolf's Lair.
40	17	"The Devil's Wedding"	Norway Estonia	Halden, Norway – Fredriksten Fortress Tallinn, Estonia – The Old House	August 4, 2010	1.388
The Ghost Hunters International team ventures out for two terrifying investigations as they head to Norway's Fredricksten Fortress and Estonia's Old House.
41	18	"Demons of Nicaragua"	Nicaragua	Masaya, Nicaragua – Coyotepe Fortress León, Nicaragua – Carcel XXI	August 11, 2010	1.394
Nicaragua is the latest location for the global ghost hunt.
42	19	"Pirates of the Caribbean"	Honduras	Omoa, Honduras – Fortaleza de San Fernando	August 18, 2010	1.352
The GHI team heads to Honduras for a chilling investigation of a fortress that was once home to a violent attack by pirates of the Caribbean.
43	20	"Hamlet's Castle"	Denmark	Helsingør, Denmark – Kronborg Castle	January 5, 2011	N/A
The GHI team travels to Denmark to investigate Kronborg Castle, the inspiration for Shakespeare's Hamlet. TAPS members Kris Williams and Britt Griffith join the team.
44	21	"Ghosts of the Eastern Bloc"	Ukraine Poland	Pidhirtsi, Ukraine – Pidhirtsi Castle Reszel, Poland – Reszel Castle	January 12, 2011	1.675
The GHI team travels to Ukraine to investigate Pidhirtsi Castle where, during World War II, the Nazis conducted human experiments. The team then travels to Reszel Castle in search of the last witch of Poland.
45	22	"Unfaithful Spirit"	Germany	Fürsteneck, Germany – Fürsteneck Castle	January 19, 2011	1.268
The GHI team travels to Germany's Fursteneck Castle, where a dangerous entity tries to bring the team down.
46	23	"Amsterdamned"	Netherlands	Huissen, Netherlands – Huissen House IJmuiden, Netherlands – IJmuiden Fortress	January 26, 2011	1.234
The GHI team travels to the Netherlands to investigate two locations: The Huissen House, known as the most haunted house in the country, is believed to have cursed its owner. Then, at the Ijmuiden Fortress the team discovers secrets hidden behind the walls.
47	24	"Army of the Dead"	Serbia	Novi Sad, Serbia – Petrovaradin Fortress	February 2, 2011	1.221
GHI travels to Serbia for one of their biggest cases ever, the massive Petrovaradin Fortress. Susan and Paul get more than they bargained for when a ghost gets a little too close, while the other teams have dangerous encounters of their own.
48	25	"Shadows in the Dark"	United Kingdom	Edinburgh, Scotland – Usher Hall Inveraray, Scotland – Inveraray Jail	February 9, 2011	1.313
The GHI team travels to Scotland to investigate the famous opera house, Usher Hall. They continue their northern journey to the Inveraray Jail, where prisoners are still thought to be serving their sentences in the afterlife.
49	26	"Soldiers of Misfortune"	Puerto Rico	San Juan, Puerto Rico – El Morro Fortress and Teatro Tapia	February 16, 2011	1.126
The GHI team travels to Puerto Rico for the first time to investigate the iconic fort, El Morro, and the ornate Teatro Tapia. These two locations are both integral to Puerto Rican culture and need GHI's help to uncover the lingering paranormal mysteries.

=== Season 3 (2011–12) ===
No. overall	No. in season	Title	Nation(s)	Location(s)	Original release date	U.S. viewers (millions)
50	1	"Rising from the Grave"	Trinidad	Lopinot Valley, Trinidad and Tobago - Lopinot Plantation	July 13, 2011	1.173
The GHI team travels deep into the rainforest of Trinidad where it is reported that the spirit of Count Lopinot, a cruel slave master, rises from the grave of his cocoa plantation. The nearby jungle, claimed to be haunted by a vampiric hag known as a soucouyant, is also investigated.
51	2	"Sensing Evil"	Trinidad Argentina	Chacachacare Island, Trinidad and Tobago - Leper Colony Gualeguaychú, Argentina - Frigorifco Gualeguaychú	July 20, 2011	1.265
The team travels to Chacachacare Island in Trinidad to investigate a former leper colony. They then journey to Gualeguaychu, Argentina to explore the Frigorifico Meat Packing Plant, where the apparitions of four murdered workers are still seen throughout the halls.
52	3	"Touched by the Dead"	United Kingdom Ireland	Limavady, Northern Ireland - Roe Valley Hospital Cork Harbour, Ireland - Spike Island	July 27, 2011	0.941
The GHI team travels to Ireland to investigate Roe Valley Hospital, where the spirit of a long dead doctor is still said to be seen. Then, the team ferries onto Spike Island prison to seek out the infamous Banshee on Ireland's Alcatraz.
53	4	"Search for the She-Wolf"	United Kingdom	Norfolk, England - Castle Rising	August 3, 2011	1.195
The GHI team travels back to England to investigate the Castle Rising, once home to Queen Isabella, and where the current groundskeeper fears lingering spirits are personally targeting him.
54	5	"Murders and Mysteries"	United Kingdom New Zealand	Castletown, Isle of Man - Castle Rushen Christchurch, New Zealand - Riccarton Racecourse Hotel	August 10, 2011	1.160
The GHI team travels to the Isle of Man to investigate Castle Rushen where an apparition of a little girl has been seen. The team then heads off to the earthquake stricken city of Christchurch, New Zealand to investigate a haunting at the Riccarton Racecourse Hotel, incited by an unsolved murder mystery.
55	6	"Imprisoned Souls"	New Zealand	Napier, New Zealand - Napier Prison	August 17, 2011	1.106
On this episode of GHI, the team heads to Napier Prison in New Zealand, to search for ghosts of former prisoners who may still be roaming the halls and jail cells.
56	7	"Temple of Doom"	Peru	Ancash, Peru - Chavin de Huantar ruins Lima, Peru - Plaza de Acho	February 22, 2012	1.312
The team opens the season in Peru for an investigation of the Chavín Ruins, tunnels that once served as an aqueduct system for the ancient civilization. But interpretations of hieroglyphics tell a darker side of the plaza's history.
57	8	"The Man in the Iron Mask"	Italy	Turin, Italy - Fort of Fenestrelle	February 29, 2012	1.173
The team treks to Italy to find out if a prison's most famous inmate is guilty of paranormal crimes.
58	9	"The Crystal Maiden"	Belize France	San Ignacio, Belize - Actun Tunichil Muknal Caves Queaux, France - Château de Fougeret	March 7, 2012	1.297
The team travels to San Ignacio, Belize to investigate the Actun Tunichil Muknal Caves and Queaux, France to investigate Chateau De Fougeret.
59	10	"Sacrificed Mayan Spirits"	Belize	San Ignacio, Belize - Cahal Pech	March 14, 2012	1.120
The team travels to San Ignacio, Belize to help a man who is being tormented by spirits haunting the Mayan Ruins of Cahal Pech. He believes they may be following him home.
60	11	"Ghoul's School"	American Samoa	Afao, American Samoa Islands - Atauloma Girls School	March 21, 2012	1.201
The team travels to American Samoa to investigate an abandoned all girls' school. It is believed that the spirit of a Samoan Chief resides on this property and in the past, possessed and killed schoolgirls.
61	12	"Rise of Frankenstein"	Belgium Italy	Antwerp, Belgium - Fortress of Antwerp Pisa, Italy - Villa di Corliano	March 28, 2012	1.136
GHI travels to the Fortress of Antwerp, Belgium to investigate a personal call for help. A woman believes her great-grandfather was buried alive during a massive WWI German bombardment. His spirit may still be guarding the Fortress.
62	13	"Hell's Gate"	Canada	Winnipeg, Manitoba, Canada - Lower Fort Garry, Boston Bar, British Columbia, Canada - Hells Gate Airtram	April 4, 2012	1.130
GHI travels to Winnipeg, Canada to answer a call for help at Lower Fort Garry. The Parks Canada staff is being tormented by paranormal activity that may be caused from gruesome deaths that took place on the property. Next the team heads to Hell's Gate, in Boston Bar, Canada where employees are so concerned about ghostly sightings and activity, they are questioning if they can open to the public in the spring.

== See also ==
- Ghost Hunters International home media releases
