= Destination Truth =

Paranormal reality television series (2007–2012)

- Title screenshot of Season 3
- Also known as: The Monster Hunter (UK)
- Genre: Documentary; Reality; Paranormal; Mystery; Travel; Adventure; Outdoors
- Developed by: Michael Mandt; Neil Mandt
- Presented by: Josh Gates
- Starring: Josh Gates
- Narrated by: Josh Gates; Jerry Bishop (intro only)
- Country of origin: United States
- Original language: English
- No. of seasons: 5
- No. of episodes: 55 (list of episodes)

Production
- Executive producers: Michael Mandt (S1–S5); Neil Mandt (S1–S5); Lucia Gervino (S1); Rob Swartz (S1); Casey Brummels (S2); Brad Kuhlman (S2–S5); Bischa Gholam (S3); Bobby Pura (S3.5–S5); Josh Gates (S5)
- Running time: 45 minutes
- Production companies: Mandt Bros. Productions; Ping Pong Productions

Original release
- Network: Syfy
- Release: June 6, 2007 – August 14, 2012

Related
- Expedition Unknown; Stranded; Ghost Hunters; Ghost Hunters International; Fact or Faked: Paranormal Files; Legendary Locations

Destination Truth is an American paranormal reality television series that premiered on June 6, 2007, on Syfy. Produced by Mandt Bros. Productions and Ping Pong Productions, the program follows paranormal researcher Josh Gates around the world to investigate claims of the supernatural, mainly in the field of cryptozoology. The third season concluded on April 21, 2010, and holds the highest ratings ever for the series, which continued with a fourth season, beginning on Thursday, September 9, 2010, at 9:00 p.m. ET/PT. The fifth season began July 10, 2012. On March 27, 2014, Gates confirmed via his Facebook account that Destination Truth had ended its run and would not be returning for a sixth season.

== Format ==
Each episode runs for about 45 minutes and typically features two investigations of paranormal activity, usually involving the search for cryptozoological creatures. Gates and his team venture out to various locations around the world where Gates interviews witnesses, reviews any physical evidence they might have, and researches the local history. Later, Gates and his team go into the field, often after nightfall, in an attempt to capture firsthand evidence of the existence of these legendary creatures. Any evidence gathered is then sent to independent experts, generally laboratories or academics in the United States, for further analysis.

The cases rely heavily on field investigation. Typically, Gates' team members split up into two or more groups to survey an area using night vision and thermal imaging cameras. They also commonly use electromagnetic field monitoring and detection equipment when cases contain claims of the supernatural. The team use walkie-talkies to relay findings to a base camp, but also carry backpack mounted cameras, microphone rigs, and hand-held night vision systems to gather evidence, and to replace a traditional camera and sound crew.

Footage from the show is usually edited from an entertainment perspective that relies on "suspense building mechanisms" such as brief segments involving team members becoming agitated or startled, asserting they have seen or heard something of interest and then followed by a sudden cut to a commercial break. Conclusion of what happened is then revealed after the break.

At the end of each segment the show details the teams findings with a brief dialog in which Gates typically either states that the accounts on which the case was based are largely myth, or that they are supported by the team's findings.

== Ratings ==
The season three premiere of Destination Truth hit a series high with 2.1 million viewers, the largest number of viewers ever for an episode of the series and the first episode to be watched by over two million viewers. The second episode of the season broke more ratings records, despite formidable competition, and achieved 2.021 million viewers, the second episode of the series to have more than 2 million viewers, and the second episode in a row to do so. The fourth episode broke the record set by the season premiere, with 2.3 million viewers. When season 3 continued on March 17, 2010, the show received its best premiere rating, with 2.2 million viewers.

== Cast and crew ==
A feature of Destination Truth is that along with Josh Gates, who heads up the investigations, members of his production crew also directly participate in the cases and double as his research team rather than remaining behind the scenes and off camera.

Final Season Cast (season 5): Josh Gates – host, lead investigator, co-producer; Erin Ryder – case manager; Kyle Wheeler – cameraman; David D'Angelo – cameraman; Katy Murakami – field investigator; Adam Butler – audio; Tristant Icaza – tech specialist; Richie Fung – medic; Former: Drew Adams – production assistant; Allie Boettger – sound engineer; Hank Braxtan – tech expert, post producer; Casey Brumels – camera operator, co-executive producer; Ron Carlson – producer; Gabriel "Gabe" Copeland – camera operator; Jael de Pardo – researcher, field producer, investigator; Rey Delgado – medic; Vlad Garcia – audio technician; Bicha Gholam – case manager; Lindsay Gillette – researcher; Tony Gonzales – tech manager; Shawn A. Goodwin – medic; Naomi Grossman – production assistant; Richard Hackney – Motion GFX, Assistant Editor; Araceli Haldeman – assistant producer	Former cont.: Sharra Jenkins – tech specialist; Chris Lore – case manager; Mike Morrell – audio engineer; Bobby Pura – co-producer, investigator; Dan Ramirez – director, camera operator; Nick Scown – producer, editor; Star Seifert – producer, researcher; Ian Shorr – producer, researcher; Erica "Shush" Shusha – camera operator; Vanessa Joy Smith – tech manager; Michael "Ponch" St. Hilaire – audio technician; Evan B. Stone – camera operator; Jarrod Tomassi – medic; Jed Udall – camera operator; Rich Velazquez – audio technician; Rex Williams – medic; Eric Wing – camera operator, producer, casting director; Ali Zubik – field producer, investigator; Other: Michael Adler – sound mixer; Brad Kuhlman – executive producer, former investigator; Neil Mandt – creator, camera operator, executive producer; Michael Mandt – creator, executive producer; Jeff Rice – producer; Angela Wittenberg – editor

=== Guest appearances ===
Over the seasons, Gates has built a relationship with the TAPS team from SyFy's paranormal show Ghost Hunters and frequently brings his own ghost hunting evidence to them for review and comment. Likewise, Gates has been on their programs, frequently hosting their Halloween specials and other live events.

Jason Hawes – TAPS investigator; Grant Wilson – TAPS investigator; Steve Gonsalves – TAPS investigator; Dave Tango – TAPS investigator; Jael de Pardo – investigator	Robb Demarest – GHI investigator; Dustin Pari – TAPS/GHI investigator; Barry Fitzgerald – GHI investigator; Kris Williams – TAPS/GHI investigator; Allison Scagliotti – actress Warehouse 13
