= Ghost Nation (TV series) =

American reality television series

- Genre: Paranormal; Reality television; Documentary
- Created by: Jason Hawes; Steve Gonsalves; Dave Tango
- Starring: Jason Hawes; Steve Gonsalves; Dave Tango
- Narrated by: Jason Hawes
- Composer: Koyo Music
- Country of origin: United States
- Original language: English
- No. of seasons: 2
- No. of episodes: 30

Production
- Executive producers: Brad Kuhlman; Casey Brumels; Josh Gates; Jason Hawes; Steve Gonsalves; Suzie Segal
- Producers: Jonathan Haug; Matthew Rishavy; Amanda Marks; Suzi Fera
- Cinematography: Daniel Zagayer
- Editor: Jeff Tober
- Camera setup: Mitchell Espinoza
- Running time: approx. 42 minutes
- Production company: Ping Pong Productions

Original release
- Network: Travel Channel (2019-2020); discovery+ (2021)
- Release: October 11, 2019 – February 27, 2021

Related
- Ghost Hunters; Kindred Spirits; Ghost Hunters Academy; Expedition Unknown

Ghost Nation is an American reality television series whose main theme is paranormal investigation. The show premiered on the Travel Channel on October 11, 2019 and moved exclusively to discovery+ on January 16, 2021. The show stars paranormal investigators Jason Hawes, Steve Gonsalves and Dave Tango, formerly from the Ghost Hunters television series, which aired on Syfy from 2004 to 2016, and aired on A&E after being revived in 2019.

Hawes, Gonsalves, and Tango, all members of the paranormal investigation group T.A.P.S., which Hawes founded, now founding members of the United Paranormal Research Organization (UPRO), respond to calls from investigators who need help with their cases in investigating reportedly haunted locations in the United States. Using a strict methodology and much of the technology from T.A.P.S. and Ghost Hunters, Hawes, Gonsalves and Tango investigate private residences while aiming to support a national and global network of paranormal investigators. The series ended when Hawes, Gonsalves, and Tango returned to Ghost Hunters after it moved to Travel Channel.

== Premise ==
The T.A.P.S. group helped to create "United Paranormal Research Organization (UPRO)", which aims to be a global paranormal investigation organization that keeps smaller, local organizations connected. The show features T.A.P.S. efforts to support fellow researchers through that organization at a national level. Hawes, who also produces the series, has stated the intent of the show differs from Ghost Hunters in that: "... you're able to see us connecting with local researchers that are bringing us in on cases they've hit a road block on. ... It's about getting back to basics, keeping it real, and truly helping people."

== Cast ==
- Jason Hawes
- Steve Gonsalves
- Dave Tango
- Shari DeBenedetti (Season 2)

== Production ==
The series premiered on October 11, 2019 on Travel Channel. On December 11, 2019, the series was renewed for a second season which premiered on April 22, 2020.

== Episodes ==
=== Season 1 (2019) ===
No.	Title	Location	Original release date	U.S. viewers (millions)
1	"The Boys are Back"	White Pine, Tennessee – private residence	October 11, 2019	0.645
An amateur paranormal investigator calls on the team to help her with a case she can't crack. The team uncovers the haunted house has a dark past, including a murder on the property and possible ties to Klan activities.
2	"A Nightmare in the Nursery"	Highland, Michigan – private residence	October 18, 2019	0.569
The Ghost Nation team heads to Highland, Michigan to help a terrified family desperate for answers about the ghostly guests living under their roof. The team sorts fact from fiction and realizes a haunting isn't always the usual suspect.
3	"The Novelist's Nightmare"	Mantua Township, New Jersey – private residence	October 25, 2019	0.602
The team answers an urgent call to investigate the Mantua Township, New Jersey home of a horror writer and his family. They suspect the terrifying apparitions and aggressive paranormal activity may be linked to a poltergeist.
4	"A Legendary Haunting"	Halifax, Virginia – private residence	November 1, 2019	0.536
The boys team up with a paranormal paramedic for a case in Halifax, Virginia that has more activity than he's ever experienced. The investigation gets turned upside down after a sketch is drawn of a terrifying female apparition.
5	"The Squire Street Haunting"	Franklin, Massachusetts – private residence	November 8, 2019	0.435
Jason's daughter, Satori Hawes, calls on the team to help on a case she can't crack in Franklin, Massachusetts. A family is fighting an unknown entity in their historic home and fear the activity is linked to witchcraft.
6	"The House at Deadman's Curve"	Dover, Delaware – private residence	November 15, 2019	0.538
The team head to Dover, Delaware to help a local paranormal investigator with her childhood home. The investigation uncovers evidence that the haunting may be connected to a deadly stretch of road just yards from the property.
7	"Ghosts from the Battlefield"	Gettysburg, Pennsylvania – private residence	November 22, 2019	0.449
Jason, Steve and Dave investigate claims of possessed mannequins and strange apparitions haunting a property just outside of Gettysburg, Pennsylvania. They soon discover that spirits aren't the only things slithering around the house.
8	"Trail of Terrors"	McMinnville, Tennessee – private residence	November 29, 2019	0.383
Jason, Steve and Dave take on a case in McMinnville, Tennessee where a woman believes paranormal phenomena in her home is affecting her health. Their investigation reveals the area's connection to the Trail of Tears could be to blame for the activity.
9	"Haunting of Weems Plantation"	Locust Grove, Georgia – private residence	December 6, 2019	0.384
Jason, Steve and Dave investigate strange noises and unnerving apparitions inside a pre-Civil War home in Locust Grove, Georgia. They uncover evidence that the haunting could be related to the evil plantation owner who once lived on the property.
10	"The Apparition of Amelia"	Brooktondale, New York – private residence	December 13, 2019	0.433
Jason, Steve and Dave investigate claims of horrific apparitions lurking inside a rural home in Brooktondale, New York. Their research reveals a series of tragic farming accidents could be to blame for the disturbing paranormal activity.

=== Season 2 (2020-2021) ===
No.	Title	Location	Original release date	U.S. viewers (millions)
1	"The Witching Tree"	Biglerville, Pennsylvania – Farquhar Farm	April 22, 2020	0.450
The team answer a distressed couple's call for help in Biglerville, Pennsylvania. The newlyweds believe a cursed "witching tree" in the yard is behind the apparitions and unexplained noises haunting their 19th-century farmhouse.
2	"An Unholy Haunting"	Waynesville, Ohio – Buckeye Charm (a former church)	April 29, 2020	0.366
Jason, Steve, Dave and Shari head to Waynesville, Ohio to investigate claims of paranormal activity at a former Catholic church. The team suspects a disgraced priest may be behind the scratches, bizarre apparitions and chilling EVPs.
3	"Prison Poltergeist"	Warwick, New York – Mid-Orange Correctional Facility	May 6, 2020	0.446
Investigating reports of electrical anomalies, shadow figures and disembodied voices at the Mid-Orange Correctional Facility in Warwick, New York. The team calls for backup when blueprints reveal just how vast the property is.
4	"Afterlife Sentence"	Warwick, New York – Mid-Orange Correctional Facility	May 13, 2020	0.372
Four new team members join Jason, Steve, Dave and Shari on their investigation of the Mid-Orange Correctional Facility in Warwick, New York. They scramble to find answers to the supernatural turbulence holding the property, and its new owners, hostage.
5	"Demonic Plantation"	Fairfield County, South Carolina – Fonti Flora Plantation	May 20, 2020	0.488
Jason, Steve, Dave and Shari travel to Blair, South Carolina to investigate reports of demonic activity at a 200-year-old plantation. Numerous deaths on the land and a dark family secret means the team has their work cut out for them.
6	"Spectre of the Surgeon"	Louisburg, North Carolina – private residence	May 27, 2020	0.506
Jason, Steve, Dave and Shari travel to Louisburg, North Carolina to investigate paranormal activity at a young couple's home. Mysterious shadows and terrifying apparitions have them fearing for their and their unborn baby's safety.
7	"Evil Ink"	Deptford Township – Zone 13 Tattoo and Body Piercing	October 17, 2020	0.453
Jason, Steve, Dave and Shari head to Deptford, New Jersey to investigate a tattoo shop where disturbing apparitions, disembodied voices, and even physical encounters are threatening the business.
8	"911 Fear Factory"	Millville, New Jersey – Wheaton Glass	October 24, 2020	0.515
Jason, Steve, Dave and Shari play cat and mouse with ghosts at a New Jersey factory. But just as the team is hot on the trail of one particularly mischievous spirit, a medical emergency jeopardizes the entire investigation.
9	"Reunion In Hell"	Newport, Rhode Island – Seaview Terrace	October 31, 2020	0.691
The team reunite with Amy Bruni and Adam Berry to investigate an imposing Rhode Island mansion consumed by a sinister energy. The owners suspect the escalating activity is linked to a dark ritual performed by a self-proclaimed warlock.
10	"Evil in the Attic"	Glen Spey, New York – Burn Brae Mansion	November 7, 2020	0.598
Jason, Steve, Dave and Shari head to Glen Spey, New York to conduct a follow-investigation of the notoriously haunted Burn Brae Mansion. To get to the bottom of the escalating paranormal activity, the team must tear down a wall leading to a secret room.
11	"Antique Shop of Horrors"	Bozrah, Connecticut – Primitive Crow Antiques and More	November 14, 2020	0.490
Jason, Steve, Dave and Shari investigate a spike in bizarre paranormal activity at an antique shop in Bozrah, Connecticut. With customers too frightened to return, the owner is desperate for answers before she is forced to shut her doors for good.
12	"Stairway to Hell"	Matawan, New Jersey – Maj. John Burrowes Mansion	November 21, 2020	0.592
Jason, Steve, Dave, and Shari join Dave's dad, Bruce, to investigate paranormal claims at the Burrowes Mansion in Matawan, New Jersey. Mysterious markings on the attic walls may hold the key to unlocking the disturbances.
13	"Do Not Disturb"	Conneaut Lake, Pennsylvania – Hotel Conneaut	January 9, 2021	0.425
Jason, Steve, Dave and Shari investigate the Hotel Conneaut in Pennsylvania. Reports of a ghost bride and mysterious attacks have put the lakeside resort's existence on the line, and the team must dig deep into the property's fiery past to find answers.
14	"Phantom Fury"	Bethel, Indiana – private residence	January 16, 2021	N/A
Jason, Steve, Dave and Shari head to rural Indiana to help a desperate family being terrorized by ghostly growls and bizarre apparitions in their home. But as the team tries to root out the source of the hostile haunting, Dave becomes its target.
15	"Lady in Black"	New Castle, Pennsylvania – private residence	January 23, 2021	N/A
Jason, Steve, Dave and Shari travel to New Castle, Pennsylvania to help a grieving couple who believe dark paranormal forces played a hand in their 14-year-old daughter's sudden death. The team calls on an old friend to eradicate the overpowering entity.
16	"Hell Unearthed"	New Hampton, New York – private residence	January 30, 2021	N/A
Jason, Steve, Dave and Shari investigate a 250-year-old dream home turned paranormal nightmare in New Hampton, New York. The team suspects the spike in activity is linked to recently unearthed artifacts, but the root cause may be more twisted.
17	"School Spirits"	Lynchburg, Virginia – Bocock Elementary School	February 6, 2021	N/A
Jason, Steve, Dave and Shari investigate an abandoned school where run-ins with shadow figures and poltergeist activity have put the owner's health in jeopardy. They dig into the property's checkered past to find the source of the ghostly retribution.
18	"Tavern of Terror"	Newburyport, Massachusetts – Brick & Ash	February 13, 2021	N/A
At the request of the mayor, Jason, Steve, Dave and Shari head to the formerly rough and tumble town of Newburyport, Massachusetts to investigate aggressive paranormal activity at a local restaurant. The intense case takes a surprising turn when an EVP reveals a shocking case of mistaken identity.
19	"Murder at the Asylum"	Harrisburg, Pennsylvania – Harrisburg State Hospital	February 20, 2021	N/A
Jason, Steve, Dave and Shari head to Pennsylvania to investigate Harrisburg State Hospital, a former asylum plagued by paranormal activity. With the impending demolition of several buildings on the sprawling campus, the surrounding community lives in fear of where the disturbed spirits will go. In their largest investigation to date, the team uncovers gruesome deaths and captures solid evidence that the ghosts of the asylum are indeed restless.
20	"Tortured Soul Asylum"	Harrisburg, Pennsylvania – Harrisburg State Hospital	February 27, 2021	N/A
Jason, Steve, Dave and Shari continue their extended investigation of Harrisburg State Hospital. Joined by Hawes' daughters, Sam and Satori, the team uses their unique approach and high-tech gear to peel away the layers of the haunted property's past. They suspect the former asylum's dark and disturbing history might be the root of the intense paranormal activity that could soon threaten the surrounding community when the buildings are demolished.

== See also ==
- Apparitional experience
- List of ghost films
