= Ghost Hunters Academy =

American paranormal reality television series

- Narrated by: Mike Rowe (intro only)
- Country of origin: United States
- Original language: English
- No. of seasons: 1
- No. of episodes: 12

Production
- Running time: 45 minutes
- Production company: Pilgrim Films & Television

Original release
- Network: Syfy
- Release: November 11, 2009 – July 7, 2010

Related
- Ghost Hunters (2004–present); Ghost Hunters International (2008–2012); Kindred Spirits; Ghost Nation

Ghost Hunters Academy is a paranormal reality television series that premiered on November 11, 2009, on the Syfy channel. The program was the third spin-off series based on Ghost Hunters (after Ghost Hunters International and UFO Hunters). The show featured TAPS members Steve Gonsalves and Dave Tango as they led a group of prospective investigators on various ghost hunting cases at locations that are allegedly haunted, and which had been previously investigated by TAPS.

== Premise ==
The series featured Dave Tango and Steve Gonsalves teaching a group of aspiring ghost hunters how to explore some of the most haunted locations in the country with the TAPS methodology from the Ghost Hunters series. Recruits were taken to some of the most "active" areas investigated on the main show at the time, such as Waverly Hills Sanatorium and St. Augustine Lighthouse. Participants who "passed" the course were able to elect to move to Ghost Hunters or Ghost Hunters International.

== Cast ==
=== Lead investigators ===
- Steve Gonsalves
- Dave Tango
- Jason Hawes (arbitrated eliminations during Season 1.5)
- Grant Wilson (arbitrated eliminations during Season 1.5)

=== Investigators-in-training ===
Dismissed

- Heathyr Hoffman (ep. 1–3)
- Chris McCune (ep. 1–5)
- Jane Riley (ep. 3–6)
- Ben Smith* (ep. 1–6)
- Chris Smith* (ep. 5–6)
- Eric Baldino (ep. 7–12)
- Rosalyn Bown (ep. 7–10)
- Daniel Hwang (ep. 7–8)
- Vera Martinez (ep. 7–11)
- Brett McGinnis (ep. 7–9)
- Natalie Poole (ep. 7)
- Michelle Tate (ep. 7–12, moved to Ghost Hunters for Season 9)

Graduated

- Karl Pfeiffer (ep. 1–6, moved on to GHI)
- Susan Slaughter (ep. 1–6, moved on to GHI)
- Adam Berry (ep. 7–12, moved on to Ghost Hunters)

*Allowed to continue training in Season 1.5, but did not return.

== Episodes ==
| No. | Title | Location(s) | Original release date | U.S. viewers (millions) |
|---|---|---|---|---|
| 1 | "Web of Deceit" | Philadelphia, Pennsylvania - Fort Mifflin | November 11, 2009 | 2.070 |
Veteran "Ghost Hunters" Steve Gonsalves and Dave Tango lead a team of young, aspiring paranormal investigators in a probe of Philadelphia's Fort Mifflin in the spin-off's premiere. At the location of their first "classroom," the legendary Fort Mifflin, Steve and Dave promise much hard work as the students learn how to gather information and properly review analysis in order to crack the case.
| 2 | "The Honeymoon's Over" | Wilmington, North Carolina - USS North Carolina Museum | November 18, 2009 | 1.703 |
The team probes the USS North Carolina regarding claims of doors slamming by themselves, disembodied voices and other strange phenomena.
| 3 | "Back to Basics" | Philadelphia, Pennsylvania - Eastern State Penitentiary | November 25, 2009 | N/A |
Eastern State Penitentiary is probed in Philadelphia regarding claims of spectral voices and footsteps, and a new recruit arrives to shake up the team.
| 4 | "Drama Queen" | Buffalo, New York - Buffalo Central Terminal | December 2, 2009 | 1.635 |
When the class travels upstate to check out Buffalo Central Terminal this week, they receive a surprise drama lesson as they're put to the test dealing with conflict in the group.
| 5 | "The Blame Game" | St. Augustine, Florida - St. Augustine Light | December 9, 2009 | N/A |
Recruits have their work cut out for them on Ghost Hunters Academy as the team heads down to Florida to investigate the St. Augustine Lighthouse. Nerves kick in when there's an addition to the group, which means class is dismissed for one of the scholars.
| 6 | "Final Exams" | Cedar Grove, New Jersey - Essex County Hospital | December 16, 2009 | N/A |
Everything the candidates have learned this semester is put to the test in their final investigation at the Essex County Asylum, the sprawling, abandoned infirmary that's supposedly home to the spirits of thousands who died within its now-decaying walls.
| 7 | "The New Class" | Louisville, Kentucky - Waverly Hills Sanatorium | June 2, 2010 | N/A |
Eight new cadets vie for one opening on TAPS, but one contestant prefers to work alone during a probe of Waverly Hills Sanatorium in Louisville.
| 8 | "Crazy for Power" | Weston, West Virginia - Trans-Allegheny Lunatic Asylum | June 9, 2010 | 1.271 |
A cadet makes a faux pas by turning off a recorder right after the team hears a strange sound.
| 9 | "Dissension in the Ranks" | Hartford, Connecticut - Mark Twain House | June 16, 2010 | N/A |
The competition heats up as the cadets travel to Hartford, CT to investigate the Mark Twain House. With only four investigations remaining, the margin of error has become razor thin, as the slightest of mistakes could send any of these investigators packing.
| 10 | "Island Castaway" | Pea Patch Island, Delaware - Fort Delaware | June 23, 2010 | 1.034 |
Only five cadets remain as the group travels to Fort Delaware, the civil war prison on Pea Patch Island. With an odd number of cadets left in the competition, Steve and Tango decide to have one team leader and let them call the shots.
| 11 | "Schooled at Shawshank" | Mansfield, Ohio - Mansfield Reformatory | June 30, 2010 | 1.277 |
With the competition almost complete, the four remaining cadets face their most daunting challenge, Mansfield Reformatory, where "The Shawshank Redemption" was filmed.
| 12 | "Finals at the Stanley Hotel" | Estes Park, Colorado - The Stanley Hotel | July 7, 2010 | 1.369 |
With a spot in TAPS so close within their grasp, the last remaining cadets head deep in the heart of the Rockies to face their steepest challenge in the Stanley Hotel, famously known as the inspiration of Stephen King's The Shining. In order to stand out on the final investigation, the cadets must pull out all the stops, and as a result collect some of the most astonishing evidence found all season.
