= Ghost Hunters International =

Television series

- Starring: See Investigators below.
- Narrated by: Mike Rowe (intro only)
- Composer: Vanacore Music Group
- Country of origin: United States
- Original language: English
- No. of seasons: 3
- No. of episodes: 62 (list of episodes)

Production
- Executive producers: Craig Piligian; Tom Thayer; Alan David; Rob Katz; Mike Nichols
- Cinematography: Alex Poppas
- Editors: Nick Arico; Kelly Bruner-Kirkpatrick; Dean Kekoolani; Craig Ridenour A.C.E.
- Camera setup: Ed Dally; Tiffany Nathanson
- Running time: 45 minutes
- Production company: Pilgrim Films & Television

Original release
- Network: Sci-Fi Channel (2008–2009); Syfy (2009–2012)
- Release: January 9, 2008 – April 4, 2012

Related
- Ghost Hunters; Ghost Hunters Academy; Destination Truth

Ghost Hunters International (abbreviated as GHI) is a spin-off series of Ghost Hunters that aired on Syfy (formerly Sci-Fi). The series premiered on January 9, 2008, and ended on April 4, 2012. Like its parent series, GHI was a reality series that followed a team of paranormal investigators; whereas the original series primarily covers only locations within the United States, the GHI team traveled around the world and documented some of the world's most legendary haunted locations.

== Investigators ==
=== Final season cast (Season 3) ===
- Barry Fitzgerald – Co-lead investigator
- Kris Williams – Co-lead investigator (moved from Ghost Hunters; 2008–2012)
- Paul Bradford – Tech manager (2009–2012)
- Joe Chin – Investigator (moved from Ghost Hunters; 2008–2012)
- Susan Slaughter – Case manager (2010–2012)
- Scott Tepperman – Investigator (2010–2012)

=== Previous cast ===
- Robb Demarest – Co-lead investigator (2008–2010)
- Brandy Green – Case manager/investigator (2008–2010)
- Dustin Pari – Investigator (moved from Ghost Hunters; 2008–2010)
- Andy Andrews – Co-lead investigator (moved from Ghost Hunters; 2008–2009)
- Brian Harnois – Tech manager (moved from Ghost Hunters; 2008–2009)
- Donna La Croix – Case manager (moved from Ghost Hunters; 2008–2009)
- Shannon Sylvia – Investigator (2008–2009)
- Angela Alderman – Investigator (2008–2009)
- Ashley Godwin – Investigator (2009–2010)

=== Guests ===
- Josh Gates – Destination Truth lead investigator, Ghost Hunters live specials host
- Grant Wilson – Ghost Hunters co-lead investigator
- Jason Hawes – Ghost Hunters co-lead investigator
- Britt Griffith – Ghost Hunters investigator
- Karl Pfeiffer – Ghost Hunters Academy investigator-in-training
- Robert Hernandez – Investigator (2008–2009)
- Paul Winters – Investigator (2008–2009)
- MJ Wayland – Ghost Historian (2009–2010) – "The Spirit of Robin Hood"

== Series overview ==
=== Episodes ===
Season	Episodes	Originally released	
Season	Episodes	First released	Last released
1	23	January 9, 2008	March 4, 2009
2	26	July 8, 2009	February 16, 2011
3	13	July 13, 2011	April 4, 2012

== Home media ==
- Ghost Hunters International — Complete First Season
- Ghost Hunters International — Season 1, Part 1 – (June 1, 2010)
- Ghost Hunters International — Season 1, Part 2 – (August 24, 2010)
- Ghost Hunters International — Season 2, Part 1 – (March 13, 2012)
- Ghost Hunters International — Season 2, Part 2 – (May 22, 2012)
- Ghost Hunters International — The Final Season – (August 27, 2013)

== See also ==
- Ghost Hunters
- Ghost hunting
- Image Entertainment
- List of ghost films
- List of reportedly haunted locations in the world
- Paranormal television
- The Atlantic Paranormal Society (TAPS)
