= Stranded (TV series) =

American paranormal investigation reality television series

- Genre: Reality; Paranormal
- Presented by: Josh Gates
- Starring: Josh Gates
- Narrated by: Josh Gates
- Country of origin: United States
- Original language: English
- No. of seasons: 1
- No. of episodes: 6

Production
- Executive producers: Josh Gates; Brad Kuhlman; Casey Brumbles; Jason Blum
- Running time: 45 minutes
- Production companies: Blumhouse Television; Ping Pong Productions

Original release
- Network: Syfy
- Release: February 27 – April 3, 2013

Related
- Destination Truth

Stranded is a 2013 American paranormal investigation reality television series that premiered on the Syfy network February 27, 2013 and is hosted by Josh Gates of Destination Truth. The show is produced by executive producers Brad Kuhlman, Casey Brumels and Josh Gates for Ping Pong Productions, and Jason Blum of Blumhouse Productions, the latter best known for the Paranormal Activity film franchise. The show has been compared to MTV's paranormal competition show Fear.

== Format ==
The show was created by Josh Gates as both a paranormal and psychological experiment. Each episode features a three-person team made up of paranormal enthusiasts and skeptics from various walks of life who spend several days alone together at some of the most allegedly haunted locations in North America. The teams create their own video footage with hand-held night-vision cameras, along with dozens of fixed cameras, that document their reactions to the ever increasing anxiety, paranoia and desolation of being trapped inside a terrifying place. The show concludes with a review of the footage and personal interviews of each member's experience.

Opening Introduction:

Real People. Investigating Real Haunted Locations. Five Days. No Camera Crew. They. Are. Stranded.

Message (before each episode):

Everything you are about to see is real. The following footage was shot entirely by the participants or by unmanned surveillance cameras.

== Reception ==
Mark Perigard of the Boston Herald gave an overall negative review stating, "'Stranded' shows that boredom, isolation and the power of suggestion—along with some careful goosing by off-screen production assistants, no doubt—can produce, ultimately, a horribly predictable show."

TV by the Numbers announced the show with a more positive review stating, "Over the course of the confinement, the subjects contend with increasingly pervasive feelings of fear and desolation, resulting in an experiment that represents a unique combination of psychology and the paranormal."

== Episodes ==
No.	Title	Location	Original release date	U.S. viewers (millions)
1	"Star Island"	Star Island, Isles of Shoals, (Rye, New Hampshire), United States	February 27, 2013	0.92
An ex-couple and their friend spend five days inside the historic and reportedly haunted, 200-room, Oceanic Hotel on the remote Star Island, which is 10-miles off the coast of New Hampshire.
2	"Seaview Terrace"	Seaview Terrace, Newport, Rhode Island, USA	March 6, 2013	0.66
Three friends from Brooklyn spend five days inside the 40,000 square foot gothic seaside mansion, Seaview Terrace, which was once the setting of the original Dark Shadows television series.
3	"West Virginia State Penitentiary"	West Virginia State Penitentiary, Moundsville, West Virginia, USA	March 13, 2013	0.67
Three family members spend five days behind the walls of the abandoned West Virginia State Penitentiary, (also known as Moundsville State Penitentiary), a prison that was home to nearly 1,000 documented deaths and executions.
4	"Burn Brae Manor"	Burn Brae Manor, Glen Spey, New York, USA	March 20, 2013	0.83
A team is stranded at the Burn Brae Manor, a bed-and-breakfast with a history of tragedies, set far back into the woods in Glen Spey, New York.
5	"Three Valley Chateau"	Three Valley Chateau, Revelstoke, British Columbia, Canada	March 27, 2013	0.79
A couple and their friend spend five days inside the 50,000 sq. ft., Three Valley Chateau, a reportedly haunted hotel in the snowy mountains 12 miles outside the old gold rush ghost town of Revelstoke, British Columbia.
6	"Yorktown Memorial Hospital"	Yorktown Memorial Hospital, Yorktown, Texas, USA	April 3, 2013	0.92
Three individuals spend five days in an abandoned and allegedly haunted Yorktown Memorial Hospital in Yorktown, Texas. During their stay, they try to connect with a deceased family member who died at a young age.
