= Barry Fitzgerald (investigator) =

Irish paranormal investigator (born 1972)

- Born: 1972 (age 52–53); Lisburn, Northern Ireland, United Kingdom
- Occupations: Paranormal investigator; photographer; author; scriptwriter
- Years active: 2004–2012

Barry Fitzgerald (born 1972) is an Irish author and paranormal investigator, and was the lead investigator on the SyFy paranormal investigative cable TV show, Ghost Hunters International.

Fitzgerald was born in the city of Lisburn, County Antrim, Northern Ireland. He has had over three decades of experience as an investigator of the supernatural.

It was written that Fitzgerald mysteriously vanished in 2016 during a covert expedition within the Iron Mountains in Ireland, searching for a Neolithic doorway to an other-world written about in an 8th-century manuscript uncovered in Trinity College, Dublin. Fitzgerald himself debunked this claim on the podcast Stirring the Cauldron hosted by Marla Brooks. It is unknown who reported this or why.

== Television appearances ==
Year	Episode	Show
2006	"Attack of the Irish Elemental"	Ghost Hunters
2007	"Irish Ruins"	Ghost Hunters
2007	"Hellfire Caves"	Ghost Hunters
2008	"Oak Alley Plantation"	Ghost Hunters
2008	"Chillingham Castle"	Ghost Hunters International
2008	"Evil Unearthed"	Ghost Hunters International
2008	"Whispers from Beyond"	Ghost Hunters International
2008	"Haunted Village"	Ghost Hunters International
2008	"Fortress of Fear"	Ghost Hunters International
2008	"Headless Haunting"	Ghost Hunters International
2008	"Frankenstein's Castle"	Ghost Hunters International
2008	"Shattered Spirit"	Ghost Hunters International
2008	"Tortured Souls"	Ghost Hunters International
2008	"Dracula's Castle"	Ghost Hunters International
2009	"Crossing Over"	Ghost Hunters
2009	"The Ghost Child of Peru"	Ghost Hunters International
2009	"City of the Doomed"	Ghost Hunters International
2009	"Restless Souls of Sweden"	Ghost Hunters International
2009	"Unknown Soldiers"	Ghost Hunters International
2009	"Spanish Scares"	Ghost Hunters International
2009	"Ghosts in the City of Lights"	Ghost Hunters International
2009	"Karosta Prison"	Ghost Hunters International
2009	"Wicklow's Gaol"	Ghost Hunters International
2009	"Skeleton in the Closet"	Ghost Hunters International
2009	"Gates to Hell"	Ghost Hunters International
2009	"Witches Castle"	Ghost Hunters International
2009	"Spirits of Italy"	Ghost Hunters International
2009	"Wicklow Gaol Exorcism"	Ghost Hunters International
2009	"Holy Ghosts"	Ghost Hunters International
2010	"Alcatraz"	Ghost Hunters
2010	"Ghost Hunters Halloween Live 2010"	Ghost Hunters
2010	"Empire State Haunt"	Ghost Hunters
2010	"Hitler's Ghost"	Ghost Hunters International
2010	"Silver Shadow"	Ghost Hunters International
2010	"Quarantine Station"	Ghost Hunters International
2010	"Port Arthur Penitentiary"	Ghost Hunters International
2010	"San Lucas Prison"	Ghost Hunters International
2010	"The Legend of Rose Hall"	Ghost Hunters International
2010	"The Spirit of Robin Hood"	Ghost Hunters International
2010	"Sweeney Todd"	Ghost Hunters International
2010	"Wolf's Lair"	Ghost Hunters International
2010	"The Devil's Wedding"	Ghost Hunters International
2010	"Demons of Nicaragua"	Ghost Hunters International
2010	"Pirates of the Caribbean"	Ghost Hunters International
2011	"Hamlet's Castle: Denmark"	Ghost Hunters International
2011	"Ghosts of the Eastern Bloc: Ukraine and Poland"	Ghost Hunters International
2011	"Unfaithful Spirit: Germany"	Ghost Hunters International
2011	"Amsterdamned: Netherlands"	Ghost Hunters International
2011	"Army of the Dead: Serbia"	Ghost Hunters International
2011	"Shadows in the Dark: Scotland"	Ghost Hunters International
2011	"The Rise of Frankenstein Belgium & Italy"	Ghost Hunters International
