= Josh Gates =

American explorer and television host

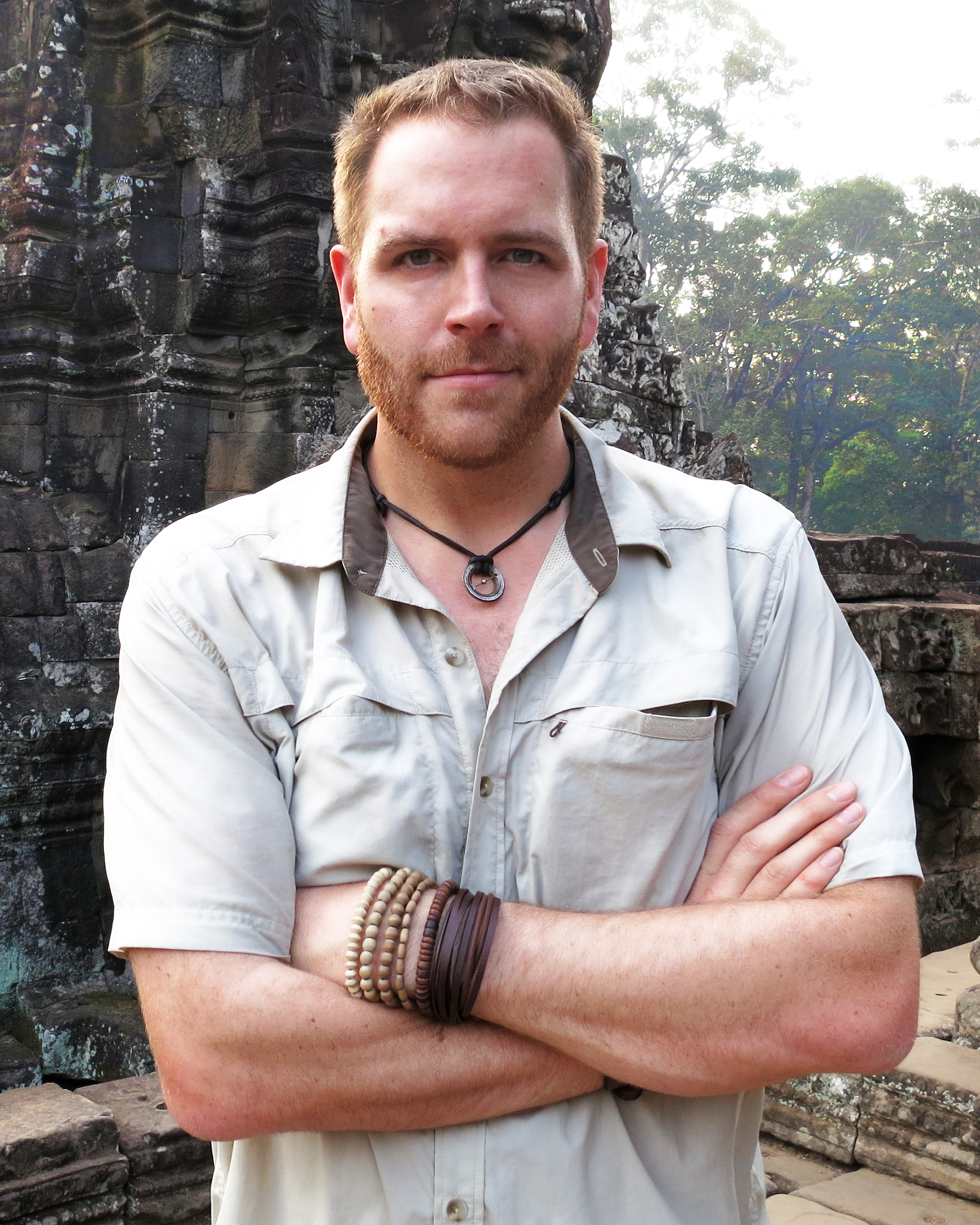
- Gates on location in Cambodia, 2013
- Born: Joshua Marshall Gates; August 10, 1977 (age 49); Manchester-by-the-Sea, Massachusetts, U.S.
- Education: Tufts University
- Occupations: Explorer; archaeologist; TV presenter; TV producer
- Notable work: “Destination Truth: Memoirs of a Monster Hunter”
- Television: Expedition Unknown, Stranded, Destination Truth, Expedition X
- Spouses: Hallie Gnatovich (m. 2014; div. 2021)
- Children: 2
- Website: www.joshuagates.com

Joshua Gates (born August 10, 1977) is an American television presenter and television producer who hosts and co-executive produces The Discovery Channel (and former Travel Channel) series Expedition Unknown and also Legendary Locations, Expedition Files, Tales From the Explorers Club, and Expedition X. He was also the host of live specials for, and a guest investigator on, the television series Ghost Hunters and its spin-off Ghost Hunters International. He produced the related Ghost Nation series along with other paranormal television shows through his production company Ping Pong Productions. He was the host and co-executive producer of Destination Truth and Stranded on Syfy.

== Personal life ==
Gates was born in Manchester-by-the-Sea, Massachusetts to Lee and Sonia Gates, and resides in Los Angeles, California. He attended Tufts University in Medford, Massachusetts, co-majoring in archeology and drama.

Gates married Destination Truth co-star Hallie Gnatovich in 2014. They have two children. Hallie Gnatovich announced on Instagram in August 2021 that the couple had been separated for about a year and a half and their divorce was finalized on July 13, 2021.

Gates is a member of The Explorers Club.

== Career ==
=== Destination Truth ===
From 2007 to 2012, Gates was the host of Destination Truth on Syfy. The series premiered its second season with its best-ever telecast, delivering 1.8 million total viewers and making the show the highest-rated second season performance by a reality series on Syfy. The series ended after its fifth season.

In 2008, Gates traveled to Walt Disney World in Florida to meet with Joe Rohde, Executive Designer of Walt Disney Imagineering. Gates presented Rohde with a cast of the "Yeti" footprint found during a Destination Truth episode. The cast is on display at Expedition Everest, a Himalayan-themed, high-speed, coaster-like attraction where guests come face-to-face with a Yeti.

As of May 2017, episodes of Destination Truth were being aired on Travel Channel.

=== Ghost Hunters ===
Gates hosted eight live specials for the television series Ghost Hunters and its spin-off Ghost Hunters International (1 episode). He also acted as a guest investigator on four episodes. He produces the related Ghost Nation series featuring former Ghost Hunters members Jason Hawes, Steve Gonsalves, and Dave Tango.

In 2007, Gates hosted the Ghost Hunters Live Halloween special, and in 2008 he made a guest-appearance on the mid-first-season finale episode of Ghost Hunters International.

He returned as the host of Ghost Hunters Live in 2008, where he helmed the live seven-hour broadcast from Fort Delaware, a Civil War POW camp in Delaware Bay. Both seasons garnered high ratings and 2008's show made Syfy the #1 cable network in prime-time on Halloween night. Gates also returned as host of the Ghost Hunters Live Halloween specials in 2009, 2010 and 2011.

Gates also hosted Ghost Hunters Live 100th episode special from the stage of Saturday Night Live in 30 Rockefeller Center, during which the TAPS team investigated Alcatraz Prison.

Gates hosted two round-table interviews with Ghost Hunters in 2007 ("Revelations") and 2008 ("All Access"). Gates returned as guest investigator on a 2009 episode wherein Essex County Penitentiary was investigated, a 2011 episode wherein Pearl Harbor Aviation Museum was investigated, a 2012 episode wherein Hammond Castle was investigated, and a 2013 episode wherein Mission San Juan Capistrano was investigated.

=== Expedition Unknown ===
Gates has hosted and executive produced Expedition Unknown on Discovery Channel after having moved from Travel Channel, since January 2015, and is in its 17th season as of June 24, 2026.

In 2020, a COVID-19 pandemic at-home variant of the show was created to fill the end of the season, and further network airtime, called Josh Gates Tonight, in which Gates video conferences with guests about travel and life.

On October 17, 2025, Expedition Unknown won the 2025 Daytime Emmy Award for best travel and adventure show.

=== Expedition: Back to the Future ===
In 2021, a four-part special of Expedition: Unknown was created titled Expedition: Back to the Future. In the series, Gates along with actor Christopher Lloyd set out to try and find the six other DeLorean Time Machines that were used during the filming of the Back to the Future movies, with the aim of donating one to The Michael J. Fox Foundation to sell off at auction to help raise money for research into Parkinson's disease.

=== Other television ===
In 2002, Josh Gates was a contestant on Beg, Borrow & Deal, a reality/game show on ESPN.

In 2006, he starred in Truly Famous, a series sponsored by Budweiser.

In May 2012, Josh was in 2 episodes of Fact or Faked: Paranormal Files where he investigated paranormal activity.

Gates was the creator, executive producer, and narrator of Stranded, a paranormal reality television series that premiered on the SyFy channel in February 2013. Gates produced the show in cooperation with Jason Blum of Blumhouse Productions.

Since relocating to Los Angeles, Gates has appeared in a number of television advertisements like Coke and Ozark Trail. He appeared in a national commercial for BMW as part of a campaign launched by Publicis New York and BMW USA. Gates has also appeared in commercials for EA Sports video games, Dish Network, and Stanley Tools.

Gates also works as a voice-over artist and can be heard as the narrator of Time Warner's audio-book of A Brother's Journey, a memoir by Richard B. Pelzer. Gates' narration was awarded the Earphones Award by Audiofile Magazine which celebrates exceptional audio presentations that excel in narrative voice and style, vocal characterizations, appropriateness for the audio format and enhancement of the text.

In February 2020, Gates premiered a new show Expedition X where fellow paranormal researcher Jessica Chobot and scientist Phil Torres investigate paranormal reports and other mysterious phenomena.

In April 2020, Gates premiered a new talk show, Josh Gates Tonight, where he videoconference interviews people from around the globe, including those previously featured on Expedition: Unknown, and, travel and adventure figures. The new show was created to fill airtime due to the interruption of productions caused by the COVID-19 pandemic, and could be filmed while isolated during lockdown and travel restrictions.
