= Fact or Faked: Paranormal Files =

2010 American TV series

- Genre: Reality; Paranormal; Mystery
- Starring: Ben Hansen; Jael de Pardo
- Country of origin: United States
- Original language: English
- No. of seasons: 2
- No. of episodes: 36

Production
- Executive producers: John Brenkus; Mickey Stern
- Running time: 60 minutes
- Production company: Base Productions

Original release
- Network: Syfy
- Release: July 15, 2010 – May 16, 2012

Related
- Ghost Hunters; Destination Truth

Fact or Faked: Paranormal Files is a paranormal investigation television series produced by Base Productions that began airing July 15, 2010, on SyFy. The show follows a team of investigators, led by former FBI agent trainee Ben Hansen (from Dr. M. David Hansen, business partner), who review various photographs and viral videos (mainly from the internet) of alleged paranormal activity. If a particular piece of evidence is deemed intriguing enough to warrant further investigation, they set out to recreate and explain the sighting.

Beginning episode #207 in the first half of season two, the show began to feature a "You Decide" segment in the middle of the program where a video is shown of something strange and then asks the viewing audience if they think the footage is fact or faked. After a commercial break the truth behind the video is revealed.

== Cast ==
Recent cast (Season 2)

- Ben Hansen – Team leader
- Jael de Pardo – Journalist
- Bill Murphy – Lead scientist
- Austin Porter – Stunt expert
- Lanisha Cole – Photographer
- Devin Marble – Tech specialist

Former cast (Season 1)

- Larry Caughlan, Jr. – Effects specialist
- Chi-Lan Lieu – Photography expert

Guests

- Josh Gates – Investigator, host of Destination Truth
- Kofi Kingston - WWE wrestler

== Reviews ==
A Variety magazine review says – "Now we know what Fox Mulder would have done after leaving "The X-Files" unit: Get his own reality-TV show!" Will Wade of Common Sense Media said the squad seemed like it was selected for the skill set rather than their readiness for TV.

== Criticism ==
Skeptical researchers such as Karen Stollznow of the James Randi Educational Foundation (JREF) have criticized the investigating competence of the Fact or Faked team, such as the Civil War cemetery ghost case from episode 6 in particular. The examined footage involves an alleged orb and mist captured on a few frames of video, and when the FoF team fail to recreate it, they conclude it to be paranormal. Stollznow claimed that by slowing the video down frame-by-frame, something that the FoF team did not do (at least on camera), the orb and mist are supposedly revealed to be a spider on a web.

In 2010, the JREF also published a story stating that the producers of FoF attempted to get a group to alter a "paranormal video" they shot in order for it to be considered for the show. The group, the Rocky Mountain Paranormal Research Society, are paranormal claims investigators who filmed a planchette of a ouija board moving around on its own. The video was deliberately faked using a hidden string and released to the internet as a demonstration of how such tricks can be done. FoF producers who saw the video contacted the group and asked that they re-shoot the video and make the pointer move more dramatically before they would make an offer to feature the video on the show.

== Episodes ==
=== Season 1 (2010) ===
No. overall	No. in season	Title	Original release date
1	1	"Burning Rubber/Hyperjump"	September 29, 2010
Ben and his investigative team go to Savannah, Georgia, to debunk a police chase video of a "ghost car" which seemingly evades pursuit by passing through a chain-link fence. Meanwhile, Bill leads the second team to Phoenix, Arizona, where they attempt to recreate a video of a series of unexplained lights that seem to jump across the sky.
2	2	"Unwanted Visitors/Strange Sightings"	October 6, 2010
Bill leads a team to Fresno, California, to investigate a surveillance video of strange unidentified figures that walk across a man's yard. Meanwhile, Ben and his team go to Lake Havasu City, Arizona to investigate video footage of a flying saucer over Lake Havasu.
3	3	"Off the Deep End/Houseguest"	October 13, 2010
Ben's team goes to Raystown Lake in Huntingdon, Pennsylvania to investigate an alleged lake monster called the "Raystown Ray" which was captured in a photograph. Meanwhile, Bill's team investigates a home in Los Angeles, where a supposed entity writes ghostly words only on Polaroid photos.
4	4	"Predator/Red Sky At Night"	October 20, 2010
Ben's team investigates a video from Dartmoor, United Kingdom, of a large, unidentified black animal filmed running across a field. Meanwhile, Bill leads his team to El Cajon, California, to debunk a video of a red triangular light formation in the night sky.
5	5	"Blazing Horizon/Rollover"	October 27, 2010
Bill and team go to Ontonagon, Michigan to investigate the "Paulding Light" – a ghostly glow that shines regularly over a valley that was once used for a railway. In the next segment, Ben and his team go to San Antonio, Texas, to solve a mystery where unseen forces seemingly push vehicles up a gravity hill and over a set of dangerous train tracks.
6	6	"The Caretaker/Cutter"	November 3, 2010
Ben's team goes to Fishers, Indiana, to investigate a video of a ghostly apparition in a civil war cemetery. Meanwhile, Bill's team tries to solve the mystery behind an unexplained cattle mutilation in San Luis, Colorado.
7	7	"Haunted Mansion Mist/Starlight Intruder"	November 10, 2010
Ben's team investigates McPike Mansion in Alton, Illinois, to recreate a video that was taken of a ghostly mist that seems to move about from room to room in the wine cellar. Meanwhile, Bill's team tries to recreate a video of triangular-shaped UFO in the night sky over Fremont, California, using LEDs mounted to a kite, a model jet plane and a hang glider.
8	8	"Symphonic Spirits/Hovering Humanoid"	November 17, 2010
Bill leads a team to the Valentown Museum in Victor, New York, to recreate a video of a ghostly figure captured by a security camera. The investigation leads to a ghost hunt after unexplained music is heard. In the next part, Ben's team tries to debunk a video taken in Mexico of what appears to be a levitating humanoid flying over a desert ridge.
9	9	"Sasquatch Sprint/Alien Attacker"	November 24, 2010
Bill's team goes to Chopaka Lake in Okanogan, Washington to recreate a video of an alleged sasquatch running across a hillside. Meanwhile, Ben and his team interview Dr. Jonathan Reed, a man who claims to have videotaped an autopsy of an alleged alien creature that attacked his dog near Snoqualmie Pass also in the state of Washington.
10	10	"Mystery Mermaid/Ghostly Guardian"	December 1, 2010
Ben's team goes to Cairns, Queensland, Australia, to recreate an underwater video of an alleged mermaid, believing the creature to be a Dugong, or a woman in a costume. Meanwhile, Bill's team goes to Honolulu, Hawaii, to investigate photographs of what a woman believes to be her granddaughter's guardian spirit.
11	11	"Lunar Landing Hoax/Tropical Intruder"	December 8, 2010
Ben's team uses a sound stage to recreate suspicious video footage from the Apollo Moon Missions that some conspiracy theorists believe were faked by NASA. In the next part, Bill's team heads to Gulf Breeze, Florida, to investigate a video of an alleged UFO in the night sky.
12	12	"Bayou Beast/River Ghost"	December 15, 2010
Ben's team goes to Slidell, Louisiana, to recreate a video of an alleged sasquatch-like creature known as the Honey Island Swamp Monster. In the next segment, Bill's team goes to Portland, Oregon, to investigate a video of a glowing orb that flies about the Hawthorne Bridge.

=== Season 2 (2011–12) ===
No. overall	No. in season	Title	Original release date
13	1	"The Real Battle of LA/Queen Mary Menace"	September 28, 2011
Ben's team tries to recreate a photograph taken of an unknown object in the sky, surrounded by searchlights and anti-aircraft fire, over Los Angeles, California, on the night of February 25, 1942—an incident that became known as the "Battle of Los Angeles." Meanwhile, Bill's team goes aboard the RMS Queen Mary in Long Beach, California, to investigate a video of an alleged ghost walking down a corridor.
14	2	"Fire in the Sky/Thermal Theater Ghost"	October 5, 2011
Bill's team goes to Jacksonville, Florida, to investigate a video of a ghostly figure captured by a ghost hunting team at the Florida Theater. Meanwhile, Ben's team tries to recreate a video of a fiery light that splits into three and then hovers in the night sky over El Paso, Texas.
15	3	"Raining UFOs/Ectoplasmic Pic"	October 12, 2011
Ben's team examines night vision video of a fiery UFO taken by a police helicopter over Long Beach, California, on Christmas of 2004. In the next segment, Bill's team tries to recreate photographs of supposed ghostly ectoplasm taken in the 1920s by a Winnipeg, Manitoba, Canada, doctor named T.G. Hamilton.
16	4	"Playground Poltergeist/Alien Intruder"	October 19, 2011
Bill's team goes to Firmat, Argentina, to investigate video taken of a playground swing that seemingly moves on its own while the other swings around it remain still. Meanwhile, Ben's team goes to Milton, Florida, to investigate an amateur video of alleged alien visitation in the middle of the night.
17	5	"Dashcam Chupacabra/Nightly News Alien"	October 26, 2011
Ben's team goes to Nordheim, Texas, to investigate a 2008 police dash cam video of a strange dog-like creature that some believe to be a chupacabra. Meanwhile, Bill's team go to the Patagonia region of Argentina where a local news video was shot depicting a humanoid creature walking behind a reporter.
18	6	"Whaley Ghost House/Muck Monster"	November 2, 2011
Bill and his team try to recreate photos of purported ghostly apparitions taken at the historic Whaley House in San Diego, California. Meanwhile, Ben's team travels to Jupiter, Florida, to investigate a video of an unknown river creature referred by locals as the "muck monster".
19	7	"UFO Crash Landing/Graveyard Ghost"	November 9, 2011
Ben's team goes to Anthony, New Mexico, to recreate a 1996 video, supposedly leaked out of the White Sands Missile Range, of an alleged flying saucer crash. Meanwhile, Bill's team goes to Tonopah, Nevada, to investigate a ghost hunting video of an alleged apparition appearing in a cemetery.
20	8	"Area 51/Cajun Apparition"	November 30, 2011
Bill's team goes to St. Francisville, Louisiana, to recreate a 2001 video taken at the historic Myrtles Plantation of an alleged ghost apparition. In the next part, Ben's team goes to Rachel, Nevada, to recreate a UFO video allegedly sneaked out of Area 51 and follow up their investigation with a nighttime sky watch of the base.
21	9	"Sinister Spirals/Flying Saucers"	December 7, 2011
Ben's team goes to Santa Ana, California, to recreate a series of photos taken in 1965 by Rex Heflin of an alleged flying saucer, a case with supposed connections to the mysterious Men in Black. In the next part, Bill's team heads to Joplin, Missouri, to investigate a video of rods—elongated insect-like creatures created by video artifacts.
22	10	"Asylum Apparition/Mystery Over Mexico"	December 14, 2011
Ben's team investigates two videos from Waverly Hills Sanatorium near Louisville, Kentucky, of two alleged apparitions moving in a hallway and of a ball that appears to move around on its own. Meanwhile, Bill's team investigates a video of an alleged fleet of UFOs flying over Guadalajara, Mexico.
23	11	"Old West Hauntings/Freeway Flyer"	January 4, 2012
Ben's team goes to the Bird Cage Theatre in Tombstone, Arizona, to recreate a 2008 video that allegedly captured a figure of a man in a coffin appearing in a mirror. Meanwhile, Bill's team tries to recreate a strange light flying over a freeway in Los Angeles.
24	12	"Bar Fright/Mexico City Cave Witch"	January 11, 2012
In the season finale, Bill's team travels to Colburn's Bar in Humble, Texas, to investigate video of an exploding ashtray allegedly caused by poltergeist activity. Meanwhile, Ben's team travels to Calacoaya, Mexico, to investigate a video of an alleged flying witch.
25	13	"The Grim Sleeper/The Real Mr. Freeze"	January 18, 2012
Bill's team goes to Atlanta, Georgia, to investigate a video of a woman who appears to levitate off a bed. Meanwhile, Ben's team goes to Los Angeles, to test the superhuman claims of Dutch stuntman Wim "The Iceman" Hof who appears to be able to withstand prolonged exposure to extreme cold temperatures.
26	14	"Bay Area Hysteria/Jersey Shore Haunting"	January 25, 2012
Ben's team goes to Bodega Bay, California, to investigate a video of a bright light hovering over the bay. Meanwhile, Bill's team travels to Paramount Theater in Asbury Park, New Jersey, to investigate a ghost apparition captured on a thermal camera.
27	15	"Vanishing Victim/Sky Serpent"	February 1, 2012
Ben's team travels to Droitwich, England, to investigate a video of a woman who appears to vanish during her sleep allegedly caused by alien abduction. In the second part, Bill's team goes to Stratford, England, and then to Oxford, England, to recreate a video of a fiery serpentine object flying through the sky.
28	16	"Pride House Specter/Bluegrass Bigfoot"	February 8, 2012
Bill's team goes to Jefferson, Texas, to recreate a photograph of a ghostly figure on a staircase taken in the Pride House. Meanwhile, Ben's team investigates a possible Bigfoot captured on video and a photo taken by a trail camera in Jefferson County, Kentucky.
29	17	"Battleship/UFO"	February 15, 2012
Ben's team travels to Wilmington, North Carolina, to investigate both a photograph and video evidence of ghostly apparitions aboard the USS North Carolina. Meanwhile, Bill's team travels to Warren, Michigan, to recreate a video of an alleged UFO.
30	18	"Reptile Rampage/Gasoline Ghoul"	April 5, 2012
Ben's team travels to Bishopville, South Carolina, the home of the Lizard Man of Scape Ore Swamp, to investigate damage caused to minivan that has been attributed to the creature. Meanwhile, Bill's team goes to Parma, Ohio, to debunk a gas station surveillance video that captured a mysterious apparition.
31	19	"Glowing Gargoyle/Phantom Feline"	April 12, 2012
Ben's team goes to Beckenham, England, and joins Destination Truth host, Josh Gates, to investigate a video of a small creature perched atop some playground equipment. Meanwhile, Bill's team heads to Bardstown, Kentucky, to investigate a video of an alleged ghost cat.
32	20	"Florida Woodland UFO/Black Forest Entity"	April 19, 2012
Bill's team heads to Pensacola, Florida, to investigate a supposed UFO video taken around an alleged UFO hot spot. Meanwhile, Ben's team goes to Pagosa Springs, Colorado, to investigate a private home allegedly plagued by glowing orbs and strange noises, some of which are allegedly caught on video.
33	21	"Graveyard Lightning/Truck Stop Terror"	April 26, 2012
Bill's team travels to a boarded-up truck stop in Union, Missouri, to examine video and photographic evidence taken by a group of paranormal investigators. In the next part, Ben's team travels to Bay St. Louis, Mississippi, to recreate photographs of lightning-like entities appearing in a cemetery.
34	22	"Into the Vortex/Tavern Shapeshifter"	May 2, 2012
Ben's team travels to Gold Hill, Oregon, to investigate the mysteries of the Oregon Vortex, a roadside attraction known for strange optical activity attributed to the paranormal. Next, Bill's team goes to Penrith, England, to recreate a video taken in a pub of an alleged shape-shifting entity.
35	23	"Surveillance Specter/Morgue Mystery"	May 9, 2012
Bill's team travels to Leicester, England, to investigate ghostly images seen on video surveillance at the reportedly haunted Belgrave Hall. Later, Ben's team goes to Louisville, Kentucky, to investigate a mysterious image in a photo and strange happenings on video from the Baxter Avenue Morgue.
36	24	"Iceland Worm Monster/Stonehenge Secrets"	May 16, 2012
In the season finale, Ben's team goes to Iceland and joins Destination Truth host, Josh Gates, on the hunt for an aquatic creature. In the next part, guest WWE wrestler Kofi Kingston helps Bill's team investigate a Stonehenge mystery.
