= Wicklow Gaol =

- Priosúin Chill Mhantáin
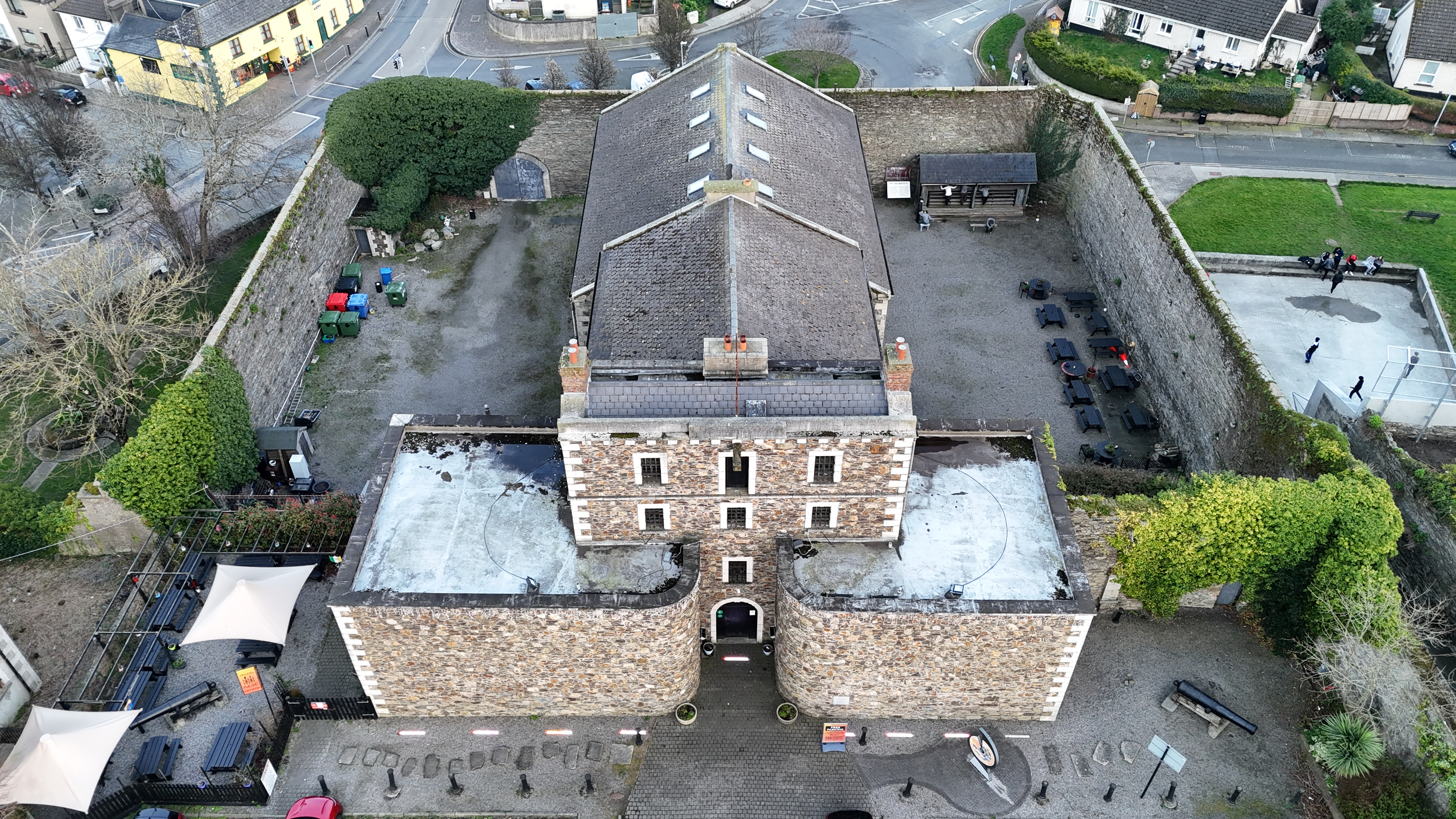
- Wicklow Gaol in 2025

- Location within Ireland
- Alternative names: The Gates of Hell

General information
- Type: Prison
- Architectural style: Victorian prison
- Location: Kilmantin Hill, Wicklow, Ireland
- Coordinates: 52.978835°N 6.037132°W
- Construction started: 1702
- Completed: 1843
- Renovated: 1995
- Demolished: 1954 (partial)

Technical details
- Material: slate, granite, red brick, timber, cast iron, concrete
- Floor count: 3

Design and construction
- Architect: William Vitruvius Morrison

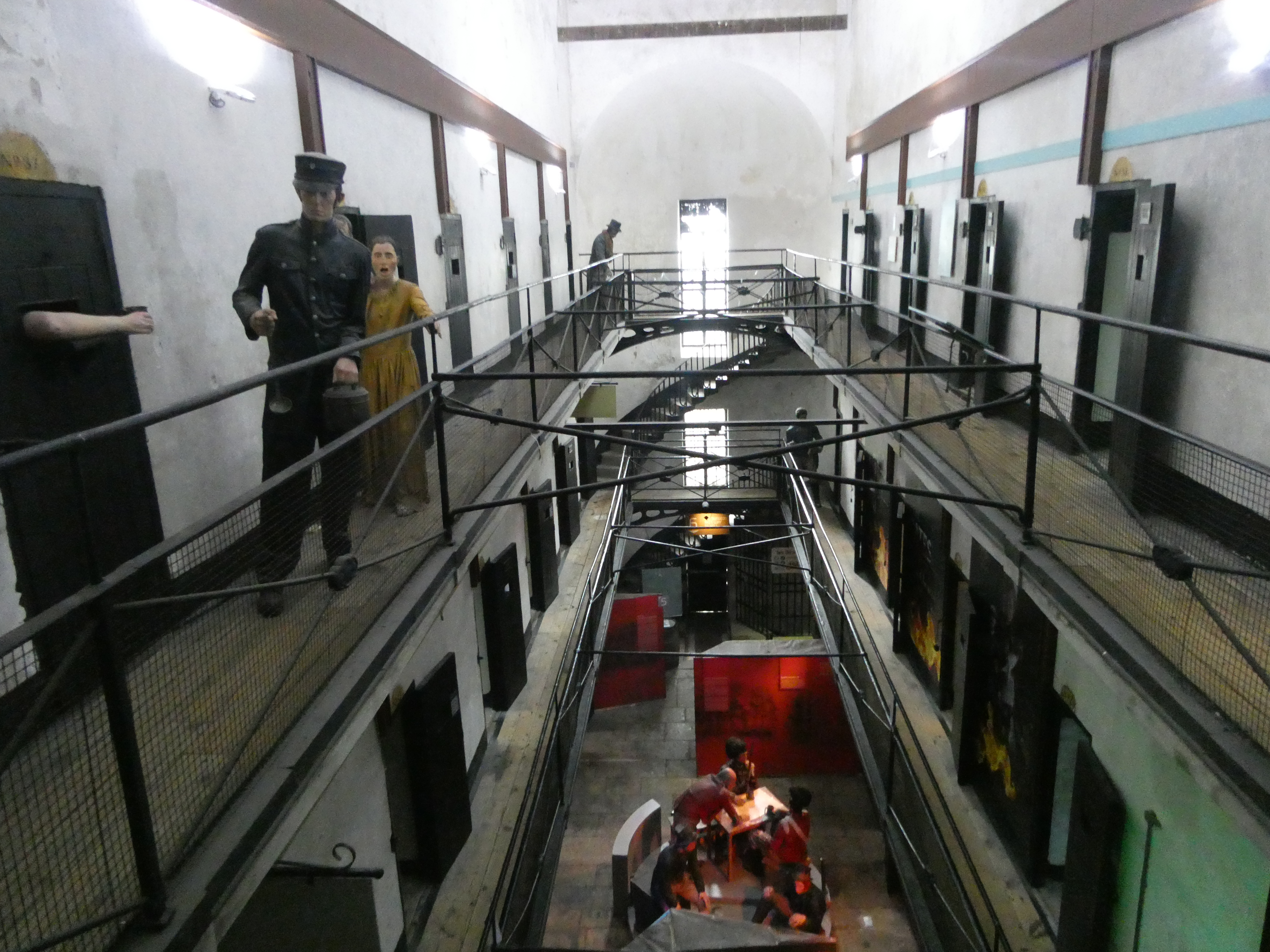
Interior

Wicklow Gaol is a former prison, now a museum, located in the town of Wicklow, County Wicklow, Ireland

== History ==
=== Prison ===
There has been a prison on the site since the late eighteenth century. Prisoners were held at Wicklow Gaol during the 1798 Rebellion and the Great Famine, as well as many held there prior to penal transportation.

The prison was extended in 1822 to a design by William Vitruvius Morrison, and further extended 1842-3.

The prison in 1877 was demoted to the status of ‘bridewell’, a prison for petty offenders awaiting trial, and closed down by 1900, but reopened in 1918 to hold republican prisoners during the Irish War of Independence and Irish Civil War (the most famous of them was Erskine Childers); the last prisoners left in 1924.

=== Museum ===
In 1995 renovations began, and it reopened as a museum in 1998, claiming to be one of the world's most haunted buildings, due to the long history of suffering associated with it. The prison was featured on a 2009 episode of Ghost Hunters International.
