= Ghost Hunters (TV series) =

2004 American paranormal reality television series

- Title card used in seasons 5 and 6 of Ghost Hunters, depicting Race Rock Light, which was investigated during season 1.
- Genre: Paranormal; Reality television Documentary
- Starring: Jason Hawes (2004–16; 2021–2023); Grant Wilson (2004–12; 2019–2020); Steve Gonsalves (2004–16; 2021–2023); Dave Tango (2005–16; 2021–2023); Amy Bruni (2008–14) others
- Narrated by: Mike Rowe (2004–16); Andy Geller (2006–07); Jim Pratt (2011); Jason Hawes (2012–16; 2021–2023); Grant Wilson (2019–2020)
- Composer: Vanacore Music
- Country of origin: United States
- Original language: English
- No. of seasons: 16
- No. of episodes: 251 (+ 12 specials not included) (list of episodes)

Production
- Executive producers: Craig Piligian; Tom Thayer; Mike Nichols; Alan David; Rob Katz
- Production locations: United States; Canada; United Kingdom (2007); Republic of Ireland (2007)
- Running time: 46 minutes
- Production company: Pilgrim Films & Television

Original release
- Network: Sci-Fi Channel (2004–2009); Syfy (2009–2016); A&E (2019–2020); Discovery+ (2021–2022); Travel Channel (2022–2023)
- Release: October 6, 2004 – May 25, 2023

Related
- Ghost Hunters International (2008–2012); Ghost Hunters Academy (2009–2010); Ghost Nation (2019–2021); Kindred Spirits; Haunted Discoveries; Destination Truth (2007–2012); Paranormal Lockdown (2016–2019); Fact or Faked: Paranormal Files (2010–2012); Expedition Unknown; Ghost Mine (2013)

Ghost Hunters is an American paranormal and reality television series. The original series aired from October 6, 2004 until October 26, 2016 on Syfy. The original program spanned eleven seasons with 230 episodes, not including 10 specials. The series was revived in early 2019 and aired its twelfth and thirteenth seasons from August 21, 2019, to May 27, 2020, on A&E, after which it was cancelled and then revived for its fourteenth season only months later on Discovery+, which started airing on October 31, 2021. Season 15 began October 1, 2022 on Travel Channel. Season 16 of Ghost Hunters started airing on Travel Channel on April 6, 2023. No plans for further seasons have been announced by Warner Bros. Discovery as of September 2025.

The program featured Jason Hawes and Grant Wilson, who founded The Atlantic Paranormal Society (TAPS) team of paranormal investigators to investigate places that are reported to be haunted. The two worked as plumbers for Roto-Rooter while moonlighting as paranormal investigators at night. For the 12th and 13th seasons, the revived show featured Wilson and a new investigatory team that had no discernible connection to TAPS, although the series still maintained the same format and producers and referenced past episodes. For the fourteenth season, Hawes and the previous TAPS incarnation from 2016 returned, while Wilson and the new team were not featured.

The series, initially produced for 10 episodes as a docu-soap, had later episodes shift to a more documentary focus. Ghost Hunters episodes feature the team going to reportedly haunted locations across the United States, with some investigations in Ireland, the United Kingdom, and Canada in earlier seasons. The latter concept led to the show's first spin-off, Ghost Hunters International, in 2008, which often featured Ghost Hunters investigators in lead and guest roles, including Hawes and Wilson. A second spin-off, Ghost Hunters Academy (2009–10), had TAPS members Dave Tango and Steve Gonsalves training prospective investigators in a competitive format. Additionally, annual Halloween specials were broadcast live from 2005 to 2011 and featured celebrity guests and interactivity.

The series popularized paranormal reality television and ghost hunting, and some members of the show have moved on to feature in their own television programs.

== Premise ==
Jason Hawes and Grant Wilson, along with other team members who belong to the group they founded, The Atlantic Paranormal Society (TAPS), investigate locations of interest by using various electronic equipment, which they believe is capable of detecting paranormal activity. The two originally worked as plumbers for Roto-Rooter as a day job while investigating locations at night.

=== Investigative procedures ===
When investigating a location, TAPS team members first visit and survey the property with its owners, who describe their experiences at the site. Next, the team sets up electronic equipment in the apparent paranormal hotspots. The TAPS team then spends several hours taking electromagnetic field and temperature readings, recording audio for EVPs, and filming with digital video cameras. Many times, they will even try to verbally coax the ghosts into responding, while recording. Afterwards, the team spends several days analyzing all of the data for evidence of possible paranormal activity.

A few days after reviewing the information, Hawes and Wilson discuss their findings with the location site owners, offer suggestions for dealing with any apparent activity, and answer any questions the owners may have.

The TAPS members state that they do not believe that every phenomenon captured is evidence of the paranormal and sometimes provide reasonable explanations such as cold spots which may be drafty windows, strange noises that may be a thumping branch or vermin in the walls, moving objects which may have been accidentally bumped or tugged, or phantom lights which can be reflections of light from a passing vehicle.

Since the series began airing, TAPS has recorded thousands of hours of audio and video data. Most investigations, according to TAPS, turn up cold with very little, if any, paranormal activity occurring; however, the ghost hunters claim to have several decent recordings of moving objects, mysterious lights, strange mists, and shadowy figures that manifest before the camera and are highlighted at the end of the show.

Sci Fi initially categorized the program as a docu-soap. In addition to the investigative aspect, the show has also presented personal conflicts and relationships among members of the TAPS team. Portions of some episodes portray Hawes and Wilson involved with their plumbing job or personal lives, but this varies by episode and is not always included. As the series progressed, however, the "behind-the-scenes" and "docu-soap" aspects were reduced, and by the fifth season the show focused primarily on the investigations, with virtually none of the docu-soap material that characterized earlier episodes.

=== Equipment used ===
During investigations, the TAPS ghost hunters team use various equipment, including digital thermometers, EMF meters, thermographic and night vision cameras, handheld and static digital video cameras, digital audio recorders, and laptop computers.

The team has also experimented, in at least one episode, with a geiger counter during their investigation to see if it would register any anomalous readings.

Starting around the third season, the team has used the K-2 (or K-II) meter, a type of EMF meter that uses a series of LEDs to measure the strength of an energy field instead of a numerical LCD screen. During the Manson murders investigation, in particular, the team used a K-2 meter in an attempt to get "yes" and "no" responses to verbal questions posed to a supposed entity in a room.

In the fifth season's "Edith Wharton Estate" case, the team introduced two new pieces of equipment: one is a custom-made geophone, which detects vibrations and flashes a series of LEDs that measure the intensity of the vibration; the second is a new EMF detector that makes a buzzing sound when in the presence of an electromagnetic field, and the stronger the field, the louder it buzzes. In the episode, the geophones were recorded on video flashing to the vibrations of what sounded like footsteps across a floor, even though no one was supposedly in the room.

Other gear not typically shown on screen are an ion generator, a device that charges the air with electricity and is theorized to help spirits manifest, and the white noise generator, an audio device that makes a static background noise and is theorized to act as a catalyst for assisting entities in making EVPs.

== Team ==
=== Current members ===
- Jason Hawes – lead investigator/producer/TAPS Founder (2004–2016; 2021–2023)
- Steve Gonsalves – co-lead investigator, previously tech manager (2004–2016; 2021–2023)
- Dave Tango – tech manager/investigator (2005–2016; 2021–2023)
- Shari DeBenedetti – investigator (2016; 2021–2023)

=== Guest members ===
Members who currently make Guest Appearances in Episodes

- Amy Bruni – Main investigator (2008–2014), Guest Investigator (2021–2023)
- Adam Berry – Ghost Hunters Academy winner, Main investigator (2010–2014), Guest Investigator (2021–2023)
- Dustin Pari – Main investigator (2005–2008; moved to GHI in 2008, returned to GH as main team member 2015–2016), Guest Investigator (2014, 2021–2023)
- Samantha Hawes – Main investigator (2014–2016), Guest Investigator (2021–2023)
- Kris Williams – case manager/investigator (2007–2011; moved to GHI in 2011) Guest Investigator (2021–2023)
- Satori Hawes – Guest Investigator (2022–2023)
- Cody Ray DesBiens – Guest Investigator (2022–2023)
- Austin Hawes– Guest Investigator (2023)

=== Former members ===
This list includes former investigators considered part of the crew, and is sorted by tenure and amount of investigations taken part in. Persons after season 1 who made less than 7 appearances are not included.

- Grant Wilson – lead investigator/producer/TAPS co-founder (2004–2012; 2014 guest; 2019–2020)
- Britt Griffith – investigator (2008–2014)
- K.J. McCormick – investigator (2010–2016)
- Brian Harnois – tech manager/investigator (2004–2007; moved to GHI)
- Donna LaCroix – case manager/investigator (2004–2007; moved to GHI)
- Kristen Luman – guest investigator (2015); co-lead investigator (2019–2020)
- Daryl Marston – co-lead investigator (2019–2020)
- Mustafa Gatollari – team researcher/investigator (2019–2020)
- Brandon Alvis – tech manager/investigator (2019–2020)
- Brian Murray – investigator (2019–2020)
- Richel Stratton – investigator (2019–2020)
- Kristyn Gartland – investigator (2005–2009)
- Joe Chin – investigator (2008–2010, moved to GHI; 2014 guest)
- Andy Andrews – investigator (2004–2007; moved to GHI)
- Traci Boiselle – case manager/Halloween special 2011 Center Command staff (2011; 2016)
- Joshua Ovenshire – tech manager (2016)
- Barry Fitzgerald – investigator/GHI lead investigator (2006–2010)
- Michelle Tate – Ghost Hunters Academy alumni, investigator (2013–2014)
- Mike Dion – investigator (2004–2007)
- Lisa Dowaliby – investigator (2006–2007)
- Ashley Troub – investigator (2012)
- Carl Johnson – demonologist (2004–2006)
- Paula Donovan – investigator (2005–2006)

=== Celebrity guest appearances (2008–2016) ===
During its first run of episodes, aside from guest investigators with connections to The Atlantic Paranormal Society, Ghost Hunters utilized connections with other Syfy and NBCUniversal series to feature actors and personalities from those programs, in particular during the live specials and especially those for Halloween:

- Josh Gates – multiple episodes (also Ghost Hunters live specials host)
- Meat Loaf – "A Bat Out of Hell", "Sloss Furnaces", and “The Haunted House on the Hill” episodes.
- Ghost Brothers - “Tortured Souls of Cresson” episode.
- Johnny Weir - “Bound by Blood” episode.
- Elijah Burke – "2007 Halloween Special" episode
- Colin Ferguson – "USS Hornet" episode
- Ben Hansen – "2010 Halloween Special" episode
- Kofi Kingston – "2010 Halloween Special" episode
- Nene Leakes, Shereé Whitfield and Kim Zolciak – "T.A.P.S. Meets The Real Housewives of Atlanta" episode
- Joe Maddalena – "2010 Halloween Special" episode
- Eddie McClintock – "Ghost of Buffalo Bill" episode
- Mike "The Miz" Mizanin – "2008 Halloween Special" episode
- CM Punk – "2006 Halloween Special" episode
- Meaghan Rath – "2010 Halloween Special" episode
- Allison Scagliotti – "2010 Halloween Special" episode
- Amanda Tapping – "2008 Halloween Special" episode
- Steve Valentine – "2008 Halloween Special" episode
- Meredith Vieira – "Murdered Matron" episode

== Production ==
On March 3, 2010, Ghost Hunters' 100th episode aired, featuring their investigation of Alcatraz Prison. The two-hour special featured a live studio audience with question and answer segments, hosted by Josh Gates of Destination Truth. The special also featured the GHI crew, the winning contestants of Ghost Hunters Academy, and Craig Piligian, the creator and executive producer of Ghost Hunters. On June 2, 2011, Syfy renewed Ghost Hunters for an eighth season, marking it as the longest-running reality series to air on the network.

On February 15, 2012, Grant Wilson announced he would be leaving the cast of Ghost Hunters in order to focus on his personal life. In a statement, Hawes responded with, "I will miss working with Grant on a daily basis, and am indebted to the level of dedication and expertise he has brought to our field. I can’t imagine having a better partner through it all — both on the show and off. Grant and I, along with our spouses and children, are all like one big family. While I fully support his decision to move on from the series, this longtime friendship — as well as our business partnership — will continue off-camera for years to come." Subsequently, Wilson also left the Beyond Reality radio show and was eventually replaced by JV Johnson, the publisher/editor of TAPS Para-magazine.

On June 7, 2016, Hawes announced that Ghost Hunters would be concluding on Syfy, with season 11 being the last season to be produced. On August 1, Wilson publicly reunited with Hawes for the first time, as a guest on Beyond Reality.

On June 26, 2019, it was announced that Ghost Hunters would be revived later that year, with Wilson returning with a new team. The 12th season, initially reported to consist of 20 episodes (later broadcast as 11 with two specials, with a 13th season premiering later), premiered on August 21, 2019 on A&E and ended on October 30, 2019. Lead investigator and producer Grant Wilson confirmed prior to the October 30, 2019 episode that Ghost Hunters would return in 2020 for a 13th season of an unspecified number of episodes. On February 18, 2020, it was announced that the 13th season would premiere on April 8, 2020. Brandon Alvis confirmed on October 17, 2020, that the show would not be returning on A&E.

On May 18, 2021 it was announced that Ghost Hunters was sold to Discovery+, and once again revived for its fourteenth season. Wilson and the new team were not featured, instead Hawes, Gonsalves, Tango, and DeBenedetti, who featured as the last cast of the original run of the show (and at the time of the purchase, the cast of Ghost Nation) returned using the TAPS moniker and methods featured previously. It airs on Discovery+ as season 14 of Ghost Hunters, but uses TAPS Returns as a subtitle in marketing. Seasons 1–11, as well as seasons 12 and 13, which aired on A&E, are now subtitled Ghost Hunters (Classic).

== Release ==
=== Series overview ===
Season	Episodes	Originally released		
Season	Episodes	First released	Last released	Network
1	10	October 6, 2004	December 15, 2004	Sci Fi
2	22	July 27, 2005	May 31, 2006	Sci Fi
3	18	October 11, 2006	November 7, 2007	Sci Fi
4	27	March 5, 2008	December 10, 2008	Sci Fi
5	25	March 11, 2009	December 16, 2009	Sci Fi Syfy (Note: Sci Fi was rebranded as Syfy on 7 July 2009; the last episode to air on Sci Fi was on 29 April 2009, and the first episode to air on SyFy was on 19 August 2009.)
6	25	March 3, 2010	December 8, 2010	Syfy
7	25	February 23, 2011	December 7, 2011	Syfy
8	26	January 11, 2012	December 5, 2012	Syfy
9	26	January 16, 2013	October 29, 2014	Syfy
10	13	August 26, 2015	November 18, 2015	Syfy
11	13	August 3, 2016	October 26, 2016	Syfy
12	11	August 21, 2019	October 30, 2019	A&E
13	9	April 8, 2020	May 27, 2020	A&E
14	13	October 31, 2021	March 19, 2022	Discovery+
15	8	October 1, 2022	November 19, 2022	Travel Channel
16	8	April 6, 2023	May 25, 2023	Travel Channel

=== Home media ===
==== Season releases ====
- Ghost Hunters — Season 1 (The Complete) – (October 18, 2005)
- Ghost Hunters — Season 2, Part 1 – (September 19, 2006)
- Ghost Hunters — Season 2, Part 2 – (September 19, 2006)
- Ghost Hunters — Season 3, Part 1 – (September 9, 2007)
- Ghost Hunters — Season 3, Part 2 – (February 26, 2008)
- Ghost Hunters — Season 4, Part 1 – (September 7, 2008)
- Ghost Hunters — Season 4, Part 2 – (March 17, 2009)
- Ghost Hunters — Season 5, Part 1 – (February 23, 2010)
- Ghost Hunters — Season 5, Part 2 – (April 27, 2010)
- Ghost Hunters — Season 6, Part 1 – (September 11, 2011)
- Ghost Hunters — Season 6, Part 2 – (September 13, 2011)
- Ghost Hunters — Season 7, Part 1 – (August 14, 2012)
- Ghost Hunters — Season 7, Part 2 – (September 2, 2012)
- Ghost Hunters — Season 8, Part 1 – (March 19, 2013)
- Ghost Hunters — Season 8, Part 2 – (June 11, 2013)
- Ghost Hunters — Season 9, Part 1 – (August 12, 2014)
- Ghost Hunters — Season 9, Part 2 – (October 21, 2014)
- Ghost Hunters — Season 9, Part 3 – (2014; no official release (Note: Only available through the TAPS More Ghosts web store.))
- Ghost Hunters — Season 10 – (2015; no official release (Note: Only available through the TAPS More Ghosts web store.))
- Ghost Hunters — Season 11 – (2016; no official release (Note: Only available through the TAPS More Ghosts web store.))

==== Live specials ====
- Ghost Hunters — Live From The Shining Hotel– 2006 Halloween Special – (September 9, 2007)
- Ghost Hunters — Stanley Hotel – 2006 Halloween Special Uncut – (2007)
- Ghost Hunters — Live From The Waverly Hills Sanatorium – 2007 Halloween Special – (September 2, 2008)

==== Compilations ====
- The Very Best of Ghost Hunters, Vol. 1 – (October 18, 2005)
- The Very Best of Ghost Hunters, Vol. 2 – (September 19, 2006)
- The Very Best of Ghost Hunters, Volumes 1 & 2 — Scary Savings Pack – (September 16, 2008)
- Ghost Hunters — The Absolute Best of Ghost Hunters – (2009)
- Ghost Hunters — The Best of Ghost Hunters – (January 5, 2010)
- Ghost Hunting — The Basics & Beyond – (September 29, 2010)
- Ghost Hunters — Military Investigations – (May 18, 2010)

== Reception ==
Ghost Hunters has garnered some of the highest ratings of any Syfy reality programming. From the start, the show has found an audience for its mix of paranormal investigation and interpersonal drama. It has since been syndicated on NBC Universal sister cable channel Oxygen and also airs on the Canadian cable network OLN.

In the early shows, TAPS was headquartered in a trailer located behind Jason Hawes' house, and they drove one white van to investigations. Within one season, they had moved the operation to a storefront in Warwick, Rhode Island, and acquired several new TAPS vehicles.

In addition to their successful television venture, TAPS operates a website where they share their stories, photographs, and ghost hunting videos with an ever-growing membership list. Because of the popularity of the show, TAPS cast members have signed contracts with at least two talent agencies, Escape Artistry and GP Entertainment, to manage their appearances at lectures, conferences and public events.

TAPS also has a three-hour weekly radio show called Beyond Reality, initially hosted by Hawes and Wilson. The radio show covers topics in a vast array of areas such as cryptozoology, spiritualism, ufology, and ghosts. The show includes guest appearances from other TAPS members and special guests such as John Zaffis, Rosemary Ellen Guiley, Chris Fleming, and others who specialize in certain fields. Noted paranormal author Jeff Belanger and Spooky Southcoast radio host and author Tim Weisberg served as fill-in hosts. The show also once simulcasted on Spooky Southcoast, airing from the Mt. Washington Hotel in New Hampshire. New episodes are broadcast every Saturday from 7 pm to 10 pm Eastern Time, though sometimes may skip a week due to the possibility of the hosts being busy with other ventures.

=== Popular culture ===
Ghost Hunters helped popularize paranormal television and ghost hunting during its original run. For much of its initial airing on Syfy, it was the top-rated paranormal reality show on television. John Blake of CNN opined in 2013 that Ghost Hunters "is to the paranormal field what Sugarhill's 'Rapper's Delight' is to hip-hop...."

Hawes, Wilson and Ghost Hunters were parodied on the 2009 episode of South Park entitled "Dead Celebrities". They have made talk-show appearances on the December 8, 2005 episode of Late Night with Conan O'Brien, the Oct 31, 2006 episode of The Ellen DeGeneres Show, a 2008 episode of The View, and the October 28, 2010 episode of Late Night with Jimmy Fallon.

=== Criticism ===
Ghost Hunters has attracted various critics and skeptics, such as Joe Nickell of the Committee for Skeptical Inquiry, Skeptical Inquirer author Lynne Kelly, James Randi, and Benjamin Radford. The Skeptical Analysis of the Paranormal Society (SAPS) was founded with the intent to recreate and debunk segments of the show.

In June 2008, Ghost Hunters was awarded The Truly Terrible Television (TTTV) Award by Independent Investigations Group for peddling pseudoscience and superstition to its audience.

During the seven-hour-long, live Halloween show on October 31, 2008, at least two events took place that critics have scrutinized: One occurs when lead investigator Grant Wilson has his jacket collar pulled down by an unseen force three times; all the while one of his hands remained at his side, which led detractors to claim he was pulling a hidden string. This happens again at one point where Hawes touches Wilson's back and his collar moves down again. Another occurs when a supposed disembodied voice tells the hunters, "You're not supposed to be here." Critics have claimed the voice sounded like it was piped in from an external audio source. In regard to the scrutiny, Wilson and Hawes defended themselves, stating that everything in the show is real. In a 2013 interview on The Reveal, Wilson stated that their television contracts forbade them from faking evidence on the show.

According to investigator Benjamin Radford, most ghost hunting groups including TAPS make many methodological mistakes. "After watching episodes of Ghost Hunters and other similar programs, it quickly becomes clear to anyone with a background in science that the methods used are both illogical and unscientific". Anyone can be a ghost investigator, "failing to consider alternative explanations for anomalous ... phenomena", considering emotions and feelings as "evidence of ghostly encounters." "Improper and unscientific investigation methods", for example, "using unproven tools and equipment", "sampling errors", "ineffectively using recording devices" and "focusing on the history of the location...and not the phenomena." In an article for Skeptical Inquirer, Radford concludes that ghost hunters should care about doing a truly scientific investigation: "I believe that if ghosts exist, they are important and deserve to be taken seriously. Most of the efforts to investigate ghosts so far have been badly flawed and unscientific — and not surprisingly, fruitless." In a New York Times article about Ghost Hunters and TAPS, Radford contended that "the group and others like it lack scientific rigor and mislead people into thinking that their homes are haunted."

The show's editing has been questioned, such as activity that is not captured on tape and findings that are unsupported by evidence in the show specifically. Tools are used in ways that are not proven effective, or in ways in which they have been proven ineffective, such as infrared thermometers that are claimed to detect cold spots in the middle of rooms when such tools are able only to measure the surface temperature of objects.

Techniques with thermal imaging cameras, Geiger counters, electronic voice phenomenon, and EMF detectors are used with little or no explanation as to how the techniques have proven to provide evidence of ghosts or other entities. There are concerns that the devices are misused, such as the noting of Benjamin Radford's article for Skeptical Inquirer: "you may own the world's most sophisticated thermometer, but if you are using it as a barometer, your measurements are worthless. Just as using a calculator doesn't make you a mathematician, using a scientific instrument doesn't make you a scientist."

== Other media ==
=== Spin-offs ===
==== Ghost Hunters International ====
A spin-off series premiered on January 9, 2008, featuring investigators Robb Demarest, Brian Harnois, Donna LaCroix, Andy Andrews, Shannon Sylvia, and Barry Fitzgerald (who appeared in the summer 2007 Ireland episodes of Ghost Hunters) since the onset, along with other rotating members from the TAPS family. The format is similar to Ghost Hunters but features investigations in various locations around the world.

==== UFO Hunters ====
Ghost Hunters producers Craig Pilligan and Tom Thayer released another paranormal investigation "special" titled UFO Hunters, (not to be confused with the show of the same name which aired on the History Channel), which first aired on January 30, 2008 but only aired for one episode. The episode followed New York Strange Phenomena Investigators (NY-SPI) co-founders Oliver Kemenczky and Ted Davis, along with paranormal researcher Dennis Anderson, as they investigated an alleged alien abduction case in Carteret, New Jersey and a strange fireball sighting in Normandy Beach, New Jersey. The format was similar to a typical Ghost Hunters episode, with most of the program dedicated to the investigation and wrapped up with a review of findings and evidence that was gathered. The pilot episode was reformatted and returned on December 13, 2008, as a special called Ny-Spi Investigates on Investigation Discovery, but was not picked up as a continuing series.

==== Ghost Hunters Academy ====
On October 23, 2008, TV Guide reported that Syfy would launch a spin-off of the show called Ghost Hunters: College Edition, which would feature "co-eds" in the ghost hunter roles. The show was later named Ghost Hunters Academy and began airing November 11, 2009. The series features Steve Gonsalves and Dave Tango leading a group of amateur ghost hunters through various investigations.

=== Later series ===
==== Kindred Spirits ====
TAPS members Adam Berry (also the finalist from Ghost Hunters Academy) and Amy Bruni left the series in 2014 to start their own program, which was subsequently named Kindred Spirits, which started airing on Destination America and TLC in 2013 and has aired 6 seasons so far, later moving to Travel Channel.

==== Ghost Nation ====
After the decision to cut ties with Syfy in 2016 and negotiations to start a new Ghost Hunters series failed, Hawes, Gonsalves, and Tango eventually came to decide to focus on efforts to help local investigators on a national level and start a new program, Ghost Nation. The program has aired on Travel Channel since October 2019.

==== Haunted Discoveries ====
In 2022, Brandon Alvis and Mustafa Gatollari announced that their new paranormal documentary series Haunted Discoveries was in full production and that their new series promises to "push the field forward." In October 2023, Haunted Discoveries debuted on the T+E network in Canada. The new series "tracks the adventures of a team of paranormal investigators on the trail of anomalies in Kentucky, long considered America's most haunted state."

== See also ==
- Apparitional experience
- List of reportedly haunted locations in the United States
- Paranormal television
- The Atlantic Paranormal Society
