= Glen Spey, New York =

- Hamlet
- Location within New York
- Coordinates: 41°28′43″N 74°48′49″W
- Country: United States
- State: New York
- County: Sullivan
- Elevation: 1,283 ft (391 m)
- Time zone: UTC-5 (Eastern (EST))
  - Summer (DST): UTC-4 (EDT)
- ZIP code: 12737
- Area code: 845
- GNIS feature ID: 951194

Glen Spey is a hamlet in the town of Lumberland, Sullivan County, New York, United States. Its ZIP code is 12737. The town's name is in reference to the spring-filled ravines, or glens, that characterize the Delaware River tributaries in the area. There are waterfalls and shady Hemlock (Tsuga canadensis) forests typical to the steep river valley terrain and many natural springs occur in the area.
