= Grant Wilson =

American novelist (born 1974)

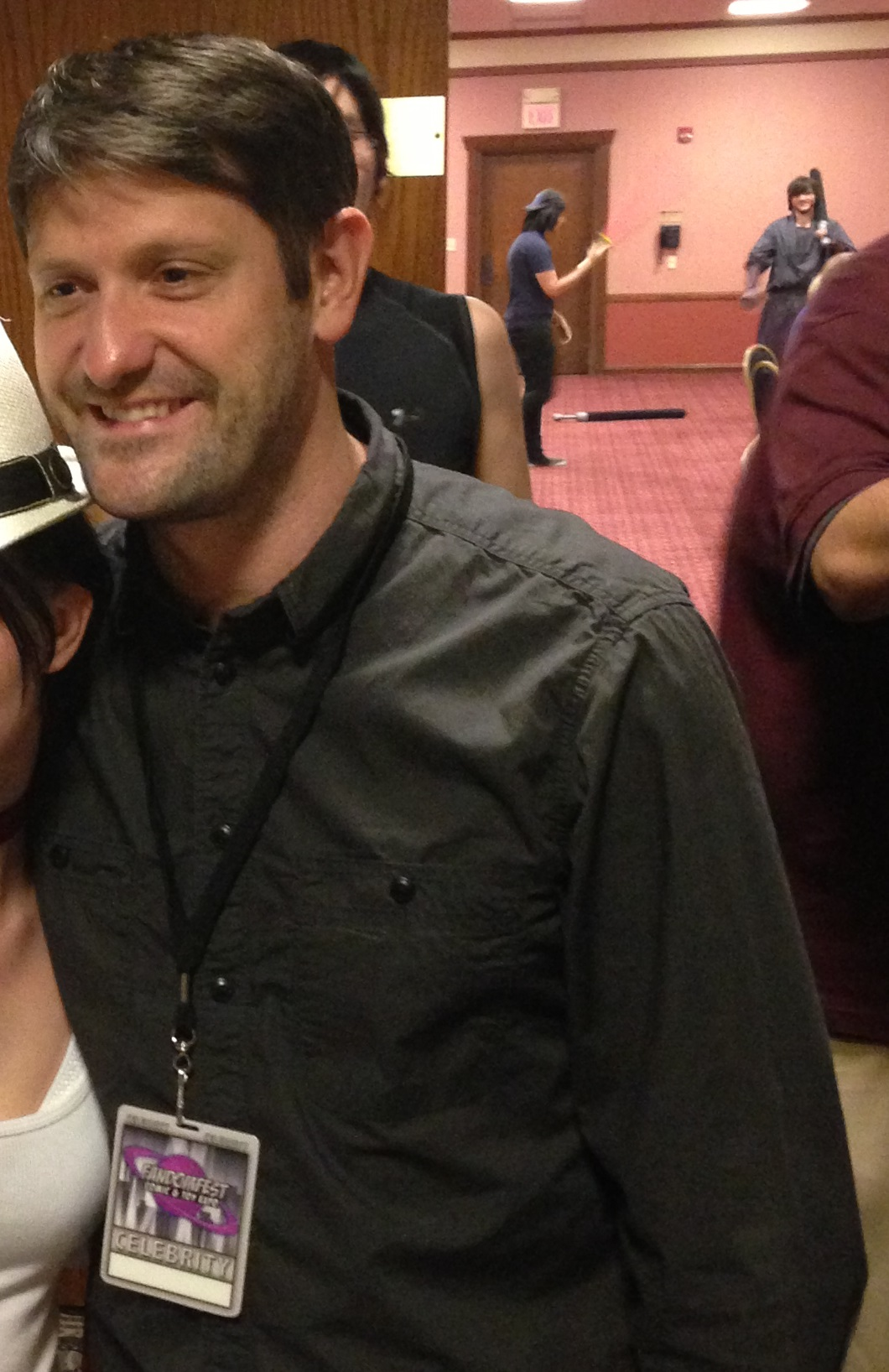
- Wilson at Fandom Fest 2013.
- Born: Grant Steven Wilson; July 3, 1974 (age 52); Providence, Rhode Island, U.S.
- Education: Ricks College
- Occupations: Plumber; Paranormal investigator Television host Television producer Author; Game Designer
- Organization: The Atlantic Paranormal Society
- Spouse: Reanna
- Children: 3

Grant Steven Wilson (born July 3, 1974) is an American art director and developer for Rather Dashing Games (now a division of Kalmbach Publishing), a game company he founded with Michael Richie, and is the co-founder of The Atlantic Paranormal Society (TAPS), which is based in Warwick, Rhode Island. He is also the star and co-producer of the cable television reality series Ghost Hunters. He left the show in 2014 and returned for the 2019 revival.

== Personal life ==
Wilson and his wife Reanna have three sons. After an early career in web design, Wilson became a plumber and worked for Roto-Rooter, a large plumbing service company based in Cincinnati, Ohio. His hobbies include writing and illustrating fantasy and role-playing game characters as well as playing and composing music on various instruments including guitar and piano.

Wilson is a member of the Church of Jesus Christ of Latter-day Saints. Wilson served an LDS Mission in Italy.

== Career ==
Wilson first met TAPS co-founder, Jason Hawes, after offering to redesign the website of the Rhode Island Paranormal Society (RIPS), a support group Hawes had formed for people who had paranormal experiences. Wilson subsequently admitted that the real reason he wanted to meet Hawes was that he had undergone an intense, recurring paranormal experience beginning at the age of fifteen. Hawes and Wilson went on to found TAPS together. According to his own account, Wilson's recurring experience involved seeing an unidentified entity in the Rhode Island woods on a regular basis.

Wilson and Hawes are longtime co-workers as plumbers for Roto-Rooter. It was Hawes who brought Wilson into the plumbing business. The two are former co-owners of the Spalding Inn, based in Whitefield, New Hampshire. Wilson, Hawes, and other members of the paranormal community frequently give lectures at schools and paranormal-related conventions. Wilson is also available for hire for private ghost hunting trips, and along with Hawes has used public ghost hunting events and personal appearances to raise money for various charities such as Cure Kids Cancer and Shriners Hospitals for Children.

Hawes and Wilson also participate in ghost hunting events created specifically for the paying public. More recently TAPS has offered an event solely hosted by the TAPS members. The personal ghost hunting events have gained more and more popularity over the years with television celebrity guests. TAPS co-hosts events locations such as the Stanley Hotel in Colorado, RMS Queen Mary ocean liner in California, and the Buffalo Central Terminal in Buffalo, New York.

On the 13th mid-season opener for South Park, Grant and Jason were both parodied and portrayed as easily frightened, going as far as to wet and poop their pants. However, neither the real-life Wilson or Jason Hawes were offended, and Grant made a post on Twitter.

On the February 15, 2012, edition of Ghost Hunters, Wilson announced that he would be leaving the Ghost Hunters show for personal reasons, including working on his own projects. The May 16, 2012, episode of Ghost Hunters was Wilson's last episode. He is now the vice president of Rather Dashing Games.

In the 10th season of Ghost Hunters, which premiered on October 8, 2014, Wilson returned to the show for the two-hour 200th episode, which was aired on October 22, 2014.

In a 2013 interview on British radio, Wilson described some of the scariest cases he had to deal with on Ghost Hunters, including being held by a whole town that practiced black magic. He also discussed life after Ghost Hunters, including his band Carpetshark and his forthcoming high-fantasy novels.

In 2019 Grant returned to Ghost Hunters on A&E for two seasons.

== Bibliography ==
- Hawes, Jason; Wilson, Grant; Friedman, Michael Jan (2007). Ghost Hunting: True Stories of Unexplained Phenomena from The Atlantic Paranormal Society. New York: Pocket Books. ISBN 978-1-4165-4113-4. LCCN 2007016062.
- Hawes, Jason; Wilson, Grant; Friedman, Michael Jan (2009). Seeking Spirits: The Lost Cases of The Atlantic Paranormal Society. New York: Pocket Books. ISBN 978-1-4391-0115-5. LCCN 2009025000.
- Hawes, Jason; Wilson, Grant; Dokey, Cameron (2010). Ghost Hunt: Chilling Tales of the Unknown. Little, Brown Books for Young Readers. ISBN 978-0316099592.
- Hawes, Jason; Wilson, Grant; Dokey, Cameron (2011). Ghost Hunt 2: MORE Chilling Tales of the Unknown. Little, Brown Books for Young Readers. ISBN 978-0316099585.
- Hawes, Jason; Wilson, Grant; Waggoner, Tim (2011). Ghost Trackers: A Novel. Pocket Books. ISBN 978-1451613810.
- Hawes, Jason; Wilson, Grant; Friedman, Michael Jan (2011). Ghost Files: The Collected Cases from Ghost Hunting and Seeking Spirits. Gallery Books. ISBN 978-1451633108.
- Hawes, Jason; Wilson, Grant; Waggoner, Tim (2012). Ghost Town: A Novel. Gallery Books. ISBN 978-1451613827.

== See also ==
- Ghost hunting
- List of reportedly haunted locations
- Paranormal television
