= Jason Hawes =

American paranormal investigator (born 1971)

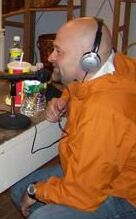
- Hawes
- Born: Jason Conrad Hawes; December 27, 1971 (age 54); Canandaigua, New York, U.S.
- Occupations: Plumber; Television host; Producer; Author; Paranormal investigator
- Organization: The Atlantic Paranormal Society

YouTube information
- Channel: Jason Hawes
- Years active: 2010–present
- Genre: Ghost hunting
- Subscribers: 217 thousand
- Views: 11.7 million
- Last updated: October 8, 2026

Jason Conrad Hawes (born December 27, 1971) is an American plumber and the co-founder of The Atlantic Paranormal Society (TAPS), which is based in Warwick, Rhode Island. He is also one of the stars and co-producers of Syfy's Ghost Hunters, which ended its initial run after its eleventh season on October 26, 2016. Several years later, the show was renewed and revived for a 12th season at A&E, with new episodes premiering in August 2019 without Hawes's participation, although he was mentioned in two episodes of A&E version Ghost Hunters by Grant Wilson. TAPS co-founder and former lead investigator Grant Wilson returned to lead a brand new team, while Hawes moved on to lead his own show with Ghost Hunters alumni Dave Tango and Steve Gonsalves in Ghost Nation, which is no longer airing on the Travel Channel since October 2019. The series ended in 2021 when the trio returned to Ghost Hunters after it moved to Travel Channel.

== Personal life ==
=== Background ===
Hawes was born in Canandaigua, New York and moved to Warwick, Rhode Island in 1979. According to his own account, Hawes began to see apparitions at the age of twenty after a girlfriend who practiced Reiki manipulated his life force energy. Paranormal researcher John Zaffis told Hawes that he was becoming sensitive to paranormal phenomena. Hawes founded the Rhode Island Paranormal Society (RIPS) in 1990 as a support group for people who had paranormal experiences.

When Hawes was twenty-two, he went on to found TAPS/The Atlantic Paranormal Society and co-create the major television hit Ghost Hunters, which became the flagship show of the Syfy Channel and made it one of the top watched channels on cable. The show's initial run ended in 2016, although it was eventually revived for a 12th season in 2019. By that time, Hawes had opted to create his own show, Ghost Nation, with Ghost Hunters alumni Steve Gonsalves and Dave Tango, which has been airing on the Travel Channel since October 2019.

=== Interests and hobbies ===
Hawes has written two books on the paranormal and four sci-fi/thriller screenplays. He and fellow TAPS founder Grant Wilson are longtime co-workers at their day job as plumbers for Roto-Rooter. It was Hawes who brought Wilson into the plumbing business. Jason has mentioned on several occasions he has a fondness for beanie hats with brims. The two are former co-owners of the Spalding Inn, based in Whitefield, New Hampshire. They finally sold the Inn in the summer of 2014.

=== Charity work ===
Hawes has used public ghost hunting events and personal appearances to raise money for various charities, such as the Shriners Hospitals for Children and Cure Kids Cancer.

=== Threatening e-mail ===
In March 2005, Barry Clinton Eckstrom, 51, of Upper St. Clair Township, Pennsylvania, began to send threatening e-mails to Jason Hawes, founder of TAPS. Hawes alerted the FBI in Providence. When the e-mails began to include threats against then President George W. Bush, the Secret Service became involved. Eckstrom also used Hawes's name to send e-mails to some female members of TAPS, in which he threatened to rape and murder them. While under surveillance by federal agents, Eckstrom used a Bethel Park, Pennsylvania library computer to send an e-mail in Hawes' name to Roto Rooter's Cincinnati headquarters, threatening to shoot employees there. Next, Eckstrom typed a message threatening to kill President Bush, again in Hawes' name, using the Department of Homeland Security's website. Before he could send the message, he was arrested. Because of these activities, Eckstrom was sentenced to two years in federal prison in January 2006.

== Bibliography ==
- Hawes, Jason; Wilson, Grant; Friedman, Michael Jan (2007). Ghost Hunting: True Stories of Unexplained Phenomena from The Atlantic Paranormal Society. New York: Pocket Books. ISBN 978-1-4165-4113-4. LCCN 2007016062.
- Hawes, Jason; Wilson, Grant; Friedman, Michael Jan (2009). Seeking Spirits: The Lost Cases of The Atlantic Paranormal Society. New York: Pocket Books. ISBN 978-1-4391-0115-5. LCCN 2009025000.
- Hawes, Jason; Wilson, Grant; Dokey, Cameron (2010). Ghost Hunt: Chilling Tales of the Unknown. Little, Brown Books for Young Readers. ISBN 978-0316099592.
- Hawes, Jason; Wilson, Grant; Dokey, Cameron (2011). Ghost Hunt 2: MORE Chilling Tales of the Unknown. Little, Brown Books for Young Readers. ISBN 978-0316099585.
- Hawes, Jason; Wilson, Grant; Waggoner, Tim (2011). Ghost Trackers: A Novel. Pocket Books. ISBN 978-1451613810.
- Hawes, Jason; Wilson, Grant; Friedman, Michael Jan (2011). Ghost Files: The Collected Cases from Ghost Hunting and Seeking Spirits. Gallery Books. ISBN 978-1451633108.
- Hawes, Jason; Wilson, Grant; Waggoner, Tim (2012). Ghost Town: A Novel. Gallery Books. ISBN 978-1451613827.

== See also ==
- Ghost hunting
- List of reportedly haunted locations
- Paranormal television
