= The Atlantic Paranormal Society =

American investigative group

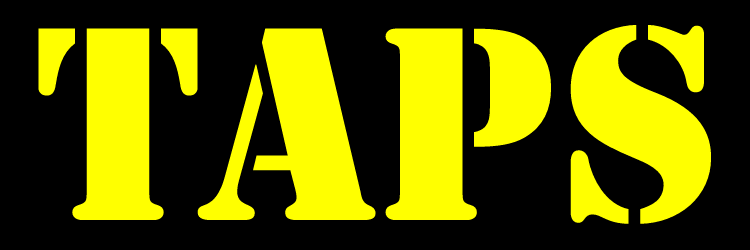
- The official TAPS logo
- Abbreviation: T.A.P.S.
- Formation: 1990; 36 years ago
- Founders: Jason Hawes; Grant Wilson
- Legal status: Volunteer organization
- Purpose: Paranormal investigating
- Headquarters: Warwick, Rhode Island
- Region served: Worldwide
- Lead Investigator: Steve Gonsalves
- Tech Manager: Dave Tango
- TAPS Investigators: Jason Hawes; Steve Gonsalves; Dave Tango; Satori Hawes; Cody Ray DesBiens; Samantha Hawes; Traci Boiselle; Tom Carroll; Wellington Chin; Rob Moccio
- Subsidiaries: TAPS Paramagazine
- Staff: 28 (2019)
- Website: www.the-atlantic-paranormal-society.com
- Formerly called: Rhode Island Paranormal Society

The Atlantic Paranormal Society (TAPS) is an organization that investigates reported paranormal activity. Based in Warwick, Rhode Island, TAPS was founded in 1990 by Jason Hawes as Rhode Island Paranormal Society (RIPS). In 1995, Grant Wilson joined, and the team was renamed The Atlantic Paranormal Society (TAPS). In 2004, the organization itself became the subject of Ghost Hunters, a popular weekly American paranormal reality television series on the Syfy channel. The show ran for eleven seasons on Syfy in the US. The show aired in the UK nine months after the US premier on Living It.

== History and objectives ==
In 1990, Hawes began the "Rhode Island Paranormal Society," after supposedly having a personal experience with spirits. After RIPS began investigating cases throughout the New England area, Jason met up with Grant Wilson in 1995 and they formed "The Atlantic Paranormal Society" together. Wilson had also had a personal experience. Neither man talks about it in public. The group was originally run out of Jason's basement, and at that time consisted only of Jason and Grant. They pioneered investigative techniques that many other paranormal investigators use. In 2003 they were approached by Pilgrim Films and taped ten episodes of "Ghost Hunters" for the Sci Fi (now Syfy) channel.

== Media ==
=== Books ===
Starting in 2007, Jason and Grant began releasing a series of books related to their work and experiences in the paranormal as well as several fiction books.

Title	Author(s)	Publisher	Released	Length	ISBN
Ghost Hunting: True Stories of Unexplained Phenomena from The Atlantic Paranormal Society	Jason Hawes and Grant Wilson	Gallery Books	2007	288 pp.	9781416541134
Seeking Spirits: The Lost Cases of The Atlantic Paranormal Society	Jason Hawes and Grant Wilson	Pocket Books	2009	288 pp.	9781439101155
Ghost Hunt: Chilling Tales of the Unknown	Jason Hawes and Grant Wilson	Little, Brown and Company	2010	277 pp.	
Ghost Hunt 2: More Chilling Tales of the Unknown	Jason Hawes and Grant Wilson	Little, Brown and Company	2011	383 pp.	
Ghost Trackers	Jason Hawes and Grant Wilson	Gallery Books	2011	384 pp.	9781451651171
Ghost Files: The Collected Cases from Ghost Hunting and Seeking Spirits	Jason Hawes and Grant Wilson	Gallery Books	2011	560 pp.	9781451633108
Ghost Town	Jason Hawes and Grant Wilson	Gallery Books	2012	288 pp.	9781451613827

=== Magazine ===
TAPS Paramagazine
- Frequency: Every other month
- Publisher: James Johnson
- Founder: Jason Hawes; Grant Wilson; Steve Gonsalves
- First issue: June 2006
- Country: United States
- Based in: Fall River, Massachusetts
- Language: English

TAPS publishes a bi-monthly publication called TAPS Paramagazine (also known as TAPS Para Mag), which features articles written by group members and information pertaining to the paranormal. Hawes stated in an interview on the skeptical podcast 'Audiomartini' that the magazine is marketed primarily in an attempt to "fund the TAPS operation." The magazine itself states that "TAPS Para Magazine is a financial sponsor of The Atlantic Paranormal Society." The average issue is approximately 39 pages in length and in 2006 was marketed by offering a behind-the-scenes DVD of the show to new subscribers.

=== Radio show and podcast ===
In April 2007, Beyond Reality Radio, a radio talk show that featured TAPS co-founders and Ghost Hunters stars Jason Hawes and Grant Wilson, began broadcasting on select radio stations in the New England area. Airing Saturdays from 7 to 10 pm, Jason and Grant interviewed guests about the Paranormal and allowed listeners to call in to contribute to the discussion. The show was produced by Amy Bruni, with help from Dave Gardiner. During the show, listeners could visit the official TAPS website and chat about the show or any other subjects in a moderated chat room. In 2012, Grant Wilson left Ghost Hunters and Beyond Reality Radio. Later on, the publisher/editor of TAPS Para-magazine, JV Johnson took on the role of co-host. Beyond Reality Radio is currently on the air Monday through Thursday, midnight – 2 am ET.

In July 2006, TAPS began releasing podcasts, TAPS Para-Radio, featuring Hawes and Wilson, on a sporadic basis.

=== Video game ===
On December 1, 2007, TAPS released a video game in conjunction with Star Mountain Studios called Apparitions: Red Reef Inn. Available online for PC & Mac, TAPS co-founder Grant Wilson claims that this game is just the start of larger efforts in the interactive media space from TAPS in the future. In January 2010, TAPS and Star Mountain Studios released a hidden object game entitled Apparitions: Kotsmine Hills.

== Methods ==
TAPS sends a group of 3 to 8 members to perform an 8- to 16-hour investigation, covering multiple nights, employing a number of infrared and digital video cameras, thermal camera devices, EMF (electromagnetic field) detectors, digital thermometers, and other equipment throughout the site in question. While at a site, the members of the team often find common explanations for the claims of the occupants. In conclusion, the team will report on its findings, and express their opinion that a site is "haunted" or "not haunted." They distinguish themselves from other paranormal groups by going into a case by claiming they wish to disprove a haunting. TAPS does not charge their clients for the investigations or consulting.

== Criticism ==
According to investigator Benjamin Radford most ghost hunting groups including TAPS make many methodological mistakes. "After watching episodes of Ghost Hunters and other similar programs, it quickly becomes clear to anyone with a background in science that the methods used are both illogical and unscientific". Anyone can be a ghost investigator, "failing to consider alternative explanations for anomalous ... phenomena", considering emotions and feelings as "evidence of ghostly encounters". "Improper and unscientific investigation methods" for example "using unproven tools and equipment", "sampling errors", "ineffectively using recording devices" and "focusing on the history of the location...and not the phenomena". In his article for Skeptical Inquirer Radford concludes that ghost hunters should care about doing a truly scientific investigation: "I believe that if ghosts exist, they are important and deserve to be taken seriously. Most of the efforts to investigate ghosts so far have been badly flawed and unscientific — and, not surprisingly, fruitless."

== Non-profit status issues ==
In 2006, a website called "SAPS" ("Skeptical Analysis of the Paranormal Society") conducted an investigation into the status and legitimacy of the TAPS non-profit status. In several places on their website it stated that they were non-profit and did investigations free of charge, however did accept donations and held a raffle to win various branded merchandise. The site claimed that repeated attempts to clarify the subject was met with negative responses. It broadened its investigation by searching for its status both federally and at the state level and found no evidence that they were a registered non-profit organization. They also found that the raffle was in violation of the state's gambling laws as it allowed those that could be under the age of 18 to participate.

In February 2007, TAPS issued a statement regarding the status. It stated that they, "...by no means meant to give the appearance that we had non-profit status. By this, we meant that we do not make any profit at all from investigating. We couldn't simply say 'TAPS makes no money whatsoever' because TAPS does gather meager funds from the occasional donation and membership dues. The money that comes in does NOT come from the client in direct relation to a case, nor does it go into anyone's pocket. So, therefore we used the term non-profit."

They have since changed non-profit to "free volunteer organization" to clear up any misconceptions and have been working on filing for the appropriate status but claim that it is very difficult for a paranormal group to do in Rhode Island.

== Notable members ==
Members of TAPS can be found worldwide. TAPS has also made honorary members of some celebrities who have participated in investigations filmed for the Ghost Hunters TV series, several of whom, such as Tapping and The Miz, appear in programming produced by the show's parent network, Syfy. They include the following people.

- Jodi Picoult – Tag along Member (1996)
- CM Punk – Honorary Member (2006)
- Elijah Burke – Honorary Member (2007)
- The Miz – Honorary Member (2008)
- Amanda Tapping – Honorary Member (2008)
- Colin Ferguson – Honorary Member (2008)
- Meat Loaf – Honorary Member (2009)
- Kofi Kingston – Honorary Member (2010)
- Joe Maddalena – Honorary Member (2010)
- Meaghan Rath – Honorary Member (2010)
- Allison Scagliotti – Honorary Member (2010)

== TAPS Family networking ==
Many paranormal investigation groups network and assist similar member groups across the nation and around the world. TAPS invites paranormal research organizations into its own network, and may refer cases to them. These organizations are part of a network called the TAPS Family. Member organizations put a "TAPS Family Member" banner on their websites, which link to The Atlantic Paranormal Society's web page. A list of member organizations is available at the TAPS Family Website.

== See also ==
- Ghost hunting
- List of reportedly haunted locations
