= List of Ghost Hunters episodes =

Ghost Hunters is an American paranormal reality television series. The original series aired from October 6, 2004, until October 26, 2016, on Syfy. The original program spanned eleven seasons with 230 episodes, not including 10 specials. The series was revived in early 2019 and aired its twelfth and thirteenth seasons from August 21, 2019, to May 27, 2020, on A&E. The series moved to Discovery+ in 2021 for its fourteenth season, starting on October 31, 2021.

The first run featured Jason Hawes and Grant Wilson of The Atlantic Paranormal Society (TAPS) investigating places that are reported to be haunted. The two originally worked as plumbers for Roto-Rooter as a day job while doing paranormal investigations of reportedly haunted locations at night. In its first iteration, Ghost Hunters aired on Wednesdays, usually around 9 pm Eastern Time, 8 pm Central Time.

For the twelfth and thirteenth seasons (2019–2020), the revived show featured Grant and a new investigatory team that had no discernible connection to TAPS, although the series still maintained the same format and producers and referenced past episodes. Brandon Alvis announced in October 2020 that the show would not be returning for another season at A&E.

On May 18, 2021, it was announced that Ghost Hunters was sold to Discovery+, and once again revived for its fourteenth season. Wilson (mentioned in Keeper of the Light) and the new team were not featured, instead, Jason Hawes, Steve Gonsalves, Dave Tango, and Sheri DeBenedetti, who featured as the last cast of the original run of the show (and at the time of the purchase, the cast of Ghost Nation) returned using the TAPS moniker and methods featured previously. It airs on Discovery+ as season 14 of Ghost Hunters, but uses TAPS Returns as a subtitle in marketing. Seasons 1–11, as well as seasons 12 and 13, which aired on A&E, are now subtitled Ghost Hunters (Classic).

== Series overview ==
Season	Episodes	Originally released		
Season	Episodes	First released	Last released	Network
1	10	October 6, 2004	December 15, 2004	Sci Fi
2	22	July 27, 2005	May 31, 2006	Sci Fi
3	18	October 11, 2006	November 7, 2007	Sci Fi
4	27	March 5, 2008	December 10, 2008	Sci Fi
5	25	March 11, 2009	December 16, 2009	Sci Fi Syfy (Note: Sci Fi was rebranded as Syfy on 7 July 2009; the last episode to air on Sci Fi was on 29 April 2009, and the first episode to air on SyFy was on 19 August 2009.)
6	25	March 3, 2010	December 8, 2010	Syfy
7	25	February 23, 2011	December 7, 2011	Syfy
8	26	January 11, 2012	December 5, 2012	Syfy
9	26	January 16, 2013	October 29, 2014	Syfy
10	13	August 26, 2015	November 18, 2015	Syfy
11	13	August 3, 2016	October 26, 2016	Syfy
12	11	August 21, 2019	October 30, 2019	A&E
13	9	April 8, 2020	May 27, 2020	A&E
14	13	October 31, 2021	March 19, 2022	Discovery+
15	8	October 1, 2022	November 19, 2022	Travel Channel
16	8	April 6, 2023	May 25, 2023	Travel Channel

== Episodes ==
=== Season 1 (2004) ===
No. overall	No. in season	Title	Location(s)	Original release date	U.S. viewers (millions)
1	1	"Altoona Tantrum"	Altoona, Pennsylvania – private residence	October 6, 2004	1.400
In the series premiere, Jason and Grant plan to take time off from their plumber jobs to investigate a ghost sighting in Altoona, Pennsylvania, but their wives are not so enthusiastic about the guys' long-distance housecall.
2	2	"Mishler Theatre"	Altoona, Pennsylvania Mishler Theatre; Railroad Museum	October 13, 2004	N/A
Jason and Grant continue their investigation of paranormal activity in Altoona, Pennsylvania, by checking out suspected ghost sightings in a theater and a railroad museum.
3	3	"The Lighthouse Inn"	New London, Connecticut – Lighthouse Inn; Ashland, Massachusetts – John Stone Tavern	October 20, 2004	N/A
The guys probe alleged paranormal activity in a restaurant.
4	4	"Race Rock Lighthouse"	New London, Connecticut – Race Rock Light	October 27, 2004	N/A
The U.S. Coast Guard recruits Jason and Grant to investigate an allegedly haunted lighthouse.
5	5	"Eastern State Penitentiary"	Philadelphia, Pennsylvania – Eastern State Penitentiary	November 3, 2004	N/A
The team searches for spirits behind bars as they investigate a ghost that allegedly harassed Al Capone in jail.
6	6	"The Converted Church"	Unknown locale, Upstate New York – converted church/private residence	November 10, 2004	N/A
Jason and Grant investigate claims by a New York couple involving ghosts in their house, a renovated church.
7	7	"The Armory"	New Bedford, Massachusetts – armory	November 17, 2004	N/A
The guys come to the aid of a TV soundman, who claims he was assaulted by an invisible entity in an armory.
8	8	"Fortuna & Topton"	Philadelphia, Pennsylvania – Fortuna residence Topton, Pennsylvania – Topton Tavern	December 1, 2004	N/A
The guys pack the van and head to the City of Brotherly Love to check out reports of paranormal activity in two Philadelphia homes.
9	9	"New Boston Inn"	Sandisfield, Massachusetts – New Boston Inn; Pittsburgh, Pennsylvania – Ulbrich-Fritz residence	December 8, 2004	N/A
Jason and Grant's squad joins another paranormal investigation team to check out spirits haunting an inn.
10	10	"The Negative Entity"	Albany, New York Johnson residence Zubrowski residence	December 15, 2004	N/A
The guys travel to Maine to help a woman who claims she's possessed.

=== Season 2 (2005–06) ===
No. overall	No. in season	Title	Location(s)	Original release date	U.S. viewers (millions)
11	1	"Myrtles Plantation"	St. Francisville, Louisiana - Myrtles Plantation	July 27, 2005	N/A
The guys travel to Louisiana to investigate rumored hauntings at the Myrtles Plantation, which is now a bed-and-breakfast.
12	2	"Cranston & Grafton"	Cranston, Rhode Island – private residence Grafton, Massachusetts – private residence	August 3, 2005	N/A
Jason, Grant and the TAPS team investigate poltergeists allegedly haunting the children of two New England families.
13	3	"The Red Room"	New Orleans, Louisiana – private residence New Orleans, Louisiana – Brennan's Restaurant	August 10, 2005	N/A
TAPS treks to New Orleans. First, the gang tries to rid a house of a troublesome spirit. Later, they visit Brennan's Restaurant in the French Quarter, a regular haunt for poltergeists.
14	4	"Mordecai House"	Wilmington, North Carolina - USS North Carolina; Raleigh, North Carolina – Mordecai House	August 17, 2005	N/A
TAPS is tapped to investigate a sighting aboard the USS North Carolina, a World War II battleship allegedly haunted by the casualties of a deadly torpedo attack.
15	5	"The Playhouse & The Firehouse"	Putnam, Connecticut – Bradley Playhouse; Coventry, Rhode Island – Harris Firehouse	August 24, 2005	N/A
TAPS investigates eerie goings-on at a Connecticut firehouse and tries to debunk an alleged haunting at a community theater. Also: an employee needs a sabbatical.
16	6	"The Ledge Lighthouse"	New London, Connecticut – Ledge Light; New York City, New York – Merchant's House Museum	August 31, 2005	N/A
Poltergeists in a New London, Connecticut, lighthouse are investigated.
17	7	"Two Houses"	Springfield, Massachusetts – Tanguay residence Harrisville, Rhode Island – Sutcliffe residence	September 7, 2005	N/A
Grant Wilson and Jason Hawes visit Springfield, Massachusetts, to check out a boy who says spirits have been pulling on him. Then, Grant and Donna LaCroix check out sounds in a second home and are more than a little spooked by what they find.
18	8	"Beechwood Mansion & Garden State"	Newport, Rhode Island – Astor Mansion; Unknown locale, New Jersey – private residence	September 14, 2005	N/A
Grant Wilson and Jason Hawes take the team to Rhode Island to investigate reports of the ghost of an electrocuted man haunting a mansion.
19	9	"Dave Tango & Rolling Hills"	Bethany, New York – Rolling Hills Asylum; Unknown locale, New Hampshire – Worthington residence	September 21, 2005	N/A
The team investigates mysterious goings-on at an old asylum in New York.
20	10	"Return to Eastern State"	Philadelphia, Pennsylvania – Eastern State Penitentiary (revisit); Unknown locale, Connecticut – Ogden vacation residence	September 28, 2005	N/A
Grant and Jason chase down an elusive apparition during a return visit to Philadelphia's Eastern State Penitentiary; the owner of a Connecticut vacation home feels threatened by otherworldly inhabitants.
21	11	"RMS Queen Mary"	San Jose, California – Winchester House; Long Beach, California – RMS Queen Mary	October 5, 2005	N/A
The TAPS team takes a road trip to California to investigate the Winchester Mystery House and the R.M.S. Queen Mary, a haunted cruise ship.
22	12	"The Lizzie Borden House"	Fall River, Massachusetts – Lizzie Borden House; Mansfield, Ohio – Mansfield Reformatory	October 12, 2005	N/A
The Ohio prison where “The Shawshank Redemption” was filmed; the house where the infamous Lizzie Borden murders occurred.
23	13	"The Crescent Hotel & Dr. Ellis"	Eureka Springs, Arkansas – Crescent Hotel	October 19, 2005	2.300
Jason and Grant discover something surprising in a haunted Arkansas town.
24	14	"Waverly Hills"	Louisville, Kentucky – Waverly Hills Sanatorium	March 29, 2006	N/A
The Waverly Hills Sanatorium in Kentucky is visited for an investigation into claims of ghostly nurse sightings, disembodied voices and shadow people. Included: testimonials from one of the building's owners and security guards.
25	15	"Ghostly Grace & The Palladium"	Holliston, Massachusetts – Mades residence Worcester, Massachusetts – Palladium Theatre	April 5, 2006	N/A
The alleged haunting of a mother and child is investigated.
26	16	"Red George & Valentown Museum"	Canandaigua, New York – Leonard residence Victor, New York – Valentown Museum	April 12, 2006	N/A
Jason Hawes' hometown is visited during a search for a ghost nicknamed George. Elsewhere, a missing mouse creates tension for the team. Also: a trip to Valentown Museum in Victor, New York.
27	17	"Two Brothers & Willard Library"	Unknown locale, Massachusetts – private residence Evansville, Indiana - Willard Library	April 19, 2006	N/A
An investigation of a library purportedly haunted by a lady ghost. The team also travels to Massachusetts to answer an emergency call.
28	18	"Hartford Conservatory"	Unknown locale, New Jersey – private residence Hartford, Connecticut – Hartford Conservatory	April 26, 2006	N/A
A New Jersey home is allegedly haunted by sinister figures.
29	19	"St. Augustine Lighthouse"	St. Augustine, Florida – St. Augustine Light	May 3, 2006	N/A
A Florida lighthouse is investigated.
30	20	"Domani's & The County Jail"	Roselle Park, New Jersey – Domani's Restaurant; St. Augustine, Florida – Old St. Johns County Jail	May 10, 2006	N/A
A 19th-century jail is investigated; a teammate's hometown is visited.
31	21	"The Stone Lion"	Guthrie, Oklahoma - Stone Lion Inn; New Bedford, Massachusetts – Edgerly residence	May 17, 2006	N/A
A purported haunting by malevolent spirits is investigated.
32	22	"The Stanley Hotel"	Estes Park, Colorado – The Stanley Hotel	May 31, 2006	1.900
Investigating Stanley Hotel in Estes Park, Colorado, the inspiration for Stephen King's The Shining.

=== Season 3 (2006–07) ===
No. overall	No. in season	Title	Location(s)	Original release date	U.S. viewers (millions)
33	1	"Tombstone"	Tombstone, Arizona – Bird Cage Theatre	October 11, 2006	N/A
Season 3 premieres. Investigating alleged hauntings at the Bird Cage Theatre in Tombstone, Ariz., a famous old-West nightspot, said to have been frequented by legendary figures such as Wyatt Earp and Doc Holliday during its operation in the 1880s.
34	2	"OK Corral"	Bisbee, Arizona – Copper Queen Hotel; Tombstone, Arizona – O.K. Corral	October 18, 2006	N/A
Searching for ghosts at the O.K. Corral in Tombstone, Ariz., the site of a legendary 1881 Wild West shoot-out involving the Earp brothers, Doc Holliday and the Clanton gang. Also: the Copper Queen Hotel in Brisbee, Ariz.
35	3	"Shadow People"	Chester, Vermont – Johnson residence Moundsville, West Virginia – West Virginia State Penitentiary	October 25, 2006	1.800
The team travels to a Vermont home and a closed penitentiary in West Virginia to investigate phenomena attributed to “shadow people.”
36	4	"Whispers & Voices"	Gardner, Massachusetts – Veau residence Washington, Massachusetts – Bucksteep Manor	November 1, 2006	N/A
Massachusetts is visited for two paranormal investigations. The team explores a Victorian mansion and an 1897 manor that has become a bed and breakfast.
37	5	"Best of the Stanley Hotel"	Estes Park, Colorado – The Stanley Hotel (revisit) (Note: This was a review of the 2006 Ghost Hunters Live Stanley Hotel investigation.)	November 8, 2006	N/A
Highlights from the 2006 Live Halloween special, in which the team investigated the Stanley Hotel, the inspiration for Stephen King's “The Shining,” are featured.
38	6	"Attack of the Irish Elemental"	County Offaly, Ireland – Leap Castle	November 15, 2006	1.800
Ireland's Leap Castle is visited as the team tries to solve the mystery of an entity dubbed, “the Elemental.”
39	7	"Irish Ruins"	County Sligo, Ireland – Lisheen Ruins; London, England – Viaduct Tavern	June 6, 2007	1.600
Ireland's Lisheen Ruins are visited for look at purported ghostly activity; the team goes to London to probe tales about the Viaduct Tavern.
40	8	"Hellfire Caves"	Buckinghamshire, England – Hellfire Caves	June 13, 2007	N/A
The team explores the Hellfire Caves, a labyrinth under rural England that was used by a secret satanic society to protect its members and stage their rituals.
41	9	"Nightmare Noises"	Warwick, Rhode Island, Rhode Island – Tedeschi residence Rutland, Massachusetts – MacLean residence	June 20, 2007	N/A
Two investigations are featured. Included: claims of toys that can purportedly switch on and off on their own are examined; the team probes strange noises and physical attacks in a Rutland, Massachusetts, home.
42	10	"Toys of Terror"	Chesapeake, Virginia – Keffer residence Charlestown, Rhode Island – General Stanton Inn	June 27, 2007	N/A
Antique dolls allegedly move by themselves in a Chesapeake, Va., home; claims concerning the General Stanton Inn in Charlestown, Rhode Island, are probed.
43	11	"USS Lexington"	Corpus Christi, Texas – USS Lexington; Warwick, Rhode Island – Warwick City Hall	July 11, 2007	N/A
Corpus Christi, Texas, is visited for an investigation aboard the USS Lexington; the team goes to Rhode Island to probe alleged spectral activity in a jail-turned-historic site.
44	12	"Manson Murders"	Hollywood, California – Manson Murders; Los Angeles, California – Jim Henson Studios	July 18, 2007	1.530
The team goes to California to probe a site close to the infamous Manson Family murders. Also: the Charlie Chaplin Studio is visited for an investigation.
45	13	"Lost Souls"	Sedro-Woolley, Washington – Northern State Hospital; Seattle, Washington – Seattle Underground Tunnels	September 26, 2007	2.015
New investigator Kris Williams joins the team for a trip to Seattle, where they search tunnels for ghosts from the Gold Rush era after probing cold spots at an abandoned psychiatric hospital.
46	14	"Spirits of San Francisco"	San Francisco, California – The Presidio; San Bruno, California – Lullaby Lane Baby Store	October 3, 2007	N/A
Claims of a deceased employee who still shows up to work – 20 years after she died – are probed; the Presidio in San Francisco is investigated.
47	15	"Ghostly Houseguest"	Sammamish, Washington – Gibbons House; Seattle, Washington – Moore Theatre	October 10, 2007	N/A
The team goes to Seattle to help a family sort out some purportedly paranormal activity. Then, the century-old Moore Theater is visited for an investigation.
48	16	"Houses of the Holy"	Prosser, Washington – St. Matthew's Church; Cranston, Rhode Island – Sprague Mansion	October 17, 2007	N/A
A priest summons TAPS to probe a church rectory in Washington State. Also: Rhode Island's Sprague Mansion is investigated.
49	17	"Salem Witch"	Salem, Massachusetts Lyceum Restaurant; Hawthorne Hotel	October 24, 2007	1.962
The Salem witch trials are examined during a trip to Massachusetts. Included: the Lyceum Bar and Grill and the Hawthorne Hotel.
50	18	"Sanatorium Live Results"	Louisville, Kentucky – Waverly Hills Sanatorium (revisit #1) (Note: This was a review of the 2007 Ghost Hunters Live Waverly Hills Sanatorium investigation.); Athol, Massachusetts – private residence	November 7, 2007	2.516
TAPS shares their findings from the 2007 Halloween investigation of Waverly Hills Sanatorium in Louisville, Ky. Also: the winner of the team's nationwide search for a new ghost hunter is revealed.

=== Season 4 (2008) ===
No. overall	No. in season	Title	Location(s)	Original release date	U.S. viewers (millions)
51	1	"Fort Mifflin"	Philadelphia, Pennsylvania - Fort Mifflin	March 5, 2008	2.700
Season 4 kicks off with a probe of Philadelphia's Fort Mifflin, a garrison used during the Revolutionary and Civil Wars, concerning claims made by visitors and facilitators of the historic site.
52	2	"Two to Tango"	Mount Holly, New Jersey – Burlington County Prison; Norwich, Connecticut – private residence	March 12, 2008	N/A
The team probes the Burlington County Prison Museum, a historic jail in Mount Holly, New Jersey. Also: a Connecticut home is investigated regarding claims involving disembodied voices and objects that move of their own accord.
53	3	"Words From Beyond"	Belchertown, Massachusetts – Clapp Memorial Library; North Attleborough, Massachusetts – private residence	March 19, 2008	N/A
Phenomena attributed to Clapp Memorial Library and claims concerning a family home purportedly haunted over four generations are investigated in Massachusetts.
54	4	"The Fear Cage"	Cashtown, Pennsylvania – Cashtown Inn	March 26, 2008	N/A
The team seeks out disembodied voices and apparitions of soldiers at Cashtown Inn, a bed-and-breakfast in Gettysburg, Pennsylvania, that once served as Civil War headquarters.
55	5	"Ghostly Bounty Hunter"	Norton, Massachusetts – private residence Trinway, Ohio – Prospect Place	April 2, 2008	N/A
Prospect Place, a stop along the Underground Railroad in Trinway, Ohio, is probed regarding claims of phantom scents and spectral whispers. Also: the team tries to help a Massachusetts family purportedly plagued by shadowy figures.
56	6	"Wright-Patterson Air Force Base"	Dayton, Ohio – Arnold House and Building #70, Wright-Patterson Air Force Base	April 9, 2008	N/A
The team probes three buildings at the Wright-Patterson Air Force Base in Dayton, Ohio, for claims concerning phantom typists, an elevator with a mind of its own and children's laughter---sans the children.
57	7	"Ghostly Conversation"	Bretton Woods, New Hampshire – Mount Washington Hotel; North Providence, Rhode Island – Ruffstone Tavern	April 16, 2008	N/A
Paranormal claims concerning the Ruff Stone Tavern in North Providence, Rhode Island, are probed. Also: the team visits New Hampshire's Mount Washington Resort, where the staff has encountered cold spots.
58	8	"Spirits of the Old West"	Goldfield, Nevada – The Goldfield Hotel; Virginia City, Nevada – Old Washoe Club	April 23, 2008	N/A
Nevada investigations put the team in the Goldfield Hotel. Also visited: the Old Washoe Club and St. Mary's Art Center in Virginia City.
59	9	"Haunted Asylum"	Weston, West Virginia – Trans-Allegheny Lunatic Asylum	April 30, 2008	N/A
Weston State Hospital, a former psychiatric hospital in West Virginia, is probed concerning claims made by volunteers who are restoring the facility.
60	10	"House of Spirits"	New Haven, Connecticut – private residence Manchester, New Hampshire – Palace Theater	May 28, 2008	2.607
A New England home is probed regarding claims made by the family. Also: the Palace Theatre, a former vaudeville destination in Manchester, New Hampshire, is investigated.
61	11	"Widow's Watch"	Yarmouth Port, Massachusetts – Colonial House Inn; Moss Beach, California – Moss Beach Distillery	June 4, 2008	N/A
Cape Cod, Massachusetts, is visited for an investigation of the historic Colonial House Inn. Also: the team searches for spirits at California's Moss Beach Distillery.
62	12	"Garden State Ghosts"	Clinton, New Jersey – The Red Mill; Perth Amboy, New Jersey – Proprietary House	June 11, 2008	N/A
Two probes in New Jersey have the team checking out the Proprietary House, home of the state's last royally appointed governor, along with a 19th-century mill.
63	13	"Fort Delaware"	Pea Patch Island, Delaware – Fort Delaware	June 18, 2008	2.500
"Hunt for a Hunter" winner Mark Fusetti joins the team as they search for Civil War–era ghosts on Pea Patch Island, home of Fort Delaware.
64	14	"Iron Island"	Buffalo, New York – Iron Island Museum	September 3, 2008	N/A
Iron Island Museum is probed in Buffalo regarding paranormal claims made about the former church.
65	15	"So She Married an Axe Murderer"	Pawtucket, Rhode Island – Slater Mill; Simsbury, Connecticut – Pettibone Tavern	September 10, 2008	N/A
Paranormal claims regarding Slater Mill in Pawtucket, Rhode Island, are investigated. Also: Connecticut's Pettibone Tavern, allegedly the site of an axe murder, is probed.
66	16	"The Boy in the Brothel"	North Kingstown, Rhode Island – Hoof Fin Feathers Carriage Inn; Groton, Connecticut – private residence	September 17, 2008	N/A
A Rhode Island banquet hall, formerly an inn that was established in 1760, is probed regarding spectral sightings and claims of cold spots in the attic. Also: Groton, Connecticut, is visited for a home investigation.
67	17	"Speaking With the Dead"	Buffalo, New York - Buffalo Central Terminal	September 24, 2008	N/A
A New York investigation has the team searching for apparitions in the Buffalo Central Terminal.
68	18	"Ghosts of the Sunshine State"	Ocala, Florida - Seven Sisters Inn; St. Petersburg, Florida – Renaissance Vinoy Resort	October 1, 2008	N/A
The team goes to Florida to probes claims concerning the Seven Sisters Inn and the Renaissance Vinoy Resort.
69	19	"Oak Alley Plantation"	Vacherie, Louisiana - Oak Alley Plantation	October 8, 2008	N/A
Oak Alley Plantation is probed in Vacherie, Louisiana.
70	20	"Bottled Spirits"	Dayville, Connecticut – private residence Appleton, New York – The Winery at Marjim Manor	October 15, 2008	N/A
An ancestral home is probed in Dayville, Connecticut, concerning claims involving a malevolent spirit; a winery is investigated in Appleton, New York.
71	21	"Hometown Haunts"	Springfield, Massachusetts – Theodores' & Smith's; Leominster, Massachusetts – Leblanc House	October 22, 2008	3.200
Two Massachusetts probes have the team investigating claims purported in Springfield and Leominster.
72	22	"USS Hornet"	Alameda, California – USS Hornet Museum	October 29, 2008	N/A
Eureka star Colin Ferguson helps the team investigate the USS Hornet in San Francisco.
73	23	"Live Show Results"	Pea Patch Island, Delaware – Fort Delaware (revisit) (Note: This was a review of the 2008 Ghost Hunters Live Fort Delaware investigation.); Topsfield, Massachusetts – McKeeham House	November 5, 2008	N/A
TAPS shares findings from the 2008 Halloween investigation of Fort Delaware in Delaware City.
74	24	"Ghost Hunters: All Access"	–	November 12, 2008	N/A
Josh Gates from Destination Truth sits down with the TAPS team to discuss their most memorable cases.
75	25	"Recycled Souls"	Clovis, California – Clovis Avenue Sanitarium; Essex, Massachusetts – The Windward Grille	November 19, 2008	N/A
Jason and Grant go to Fresno, Cal., to investigate claims concerning the Clovis Avenue Sanitarium.
76	26	"Spirits on the Water"	San Diego, California – Maritime Museum of San Diego (Star of India & Berkeley)	December 3, 2008	N/A
The team boards ships docked off of San Diego to probe paranormal claims pertaining to the Berkeley, a 1898 steamboat ferry, and the Star of India, the oldest active ship in the world.
77	27	"Portsmouth Harbor Lighthouse"	New Castle, New Hampshire – Fort William and Mary/Portsmouth Harbor Light	December 10, 2008	2.800
Portsmouth Harbor Lighthouse and Fort Constitution are probed in New Hampshire regarding claims of apparition sightings and other strange phenomena.

=== Season 5 (2009) ===
No. overall	No. in season	Title	Location(s)	Original release date	U.S. viewers (millions)
78	1	"Betsy Ross House"	Glen Mills, Pennsylvania – Hannum House; Philadelphia, Pennsylvania – Betsy Ross House	March 11, 2009	3.050
The home of Betsy Ross is probed in Philadelphia as Season 5 begins; the team investigates a house in Glen Mills, Pennsylvania, that is over 300 years old.
79	2	"Star Island"	Portsmouth, New Hampshire – Star Island; Gilford, New Hampshire – Kimball Castle	March 18, 2009	N/A
TAPS go to Star Island, part of the Isles of Shoals off of Portsmouth, New Hampshire, for a paranormal investigation.
80	3	"Edith Wharton Estate"	Lenox, Massachusetts – The Mount (Edith Wharton residence)	March 25, 2009	N/A
The team visits Lenox, Massachusetts, to investigate the home of author Edith Wharton.
81	4	"Club Dead"	Ybor City, Tampa, Florida The Cuban Club (El Circulo Cubano de Tampa); Trelles Clinic	April 1, 2009	1.800
The team goes to Florida to investigate sightings of a female apparition at the historic El Circulo Cubano de Tampa. Another TAPS visit features the abandoned Trelles Clinic in Ybor City.
82	5	"Soul Searching"	Newport, Rhode Island – Belcourt Castle; Somerville, Massachusetts – Sacco's Bowl-Haven	April 8, 2009	N/A
TAPS investigate Belcourt Castle in Newport, Rhode Island; Sacco's Bowl Haven, an old-time bowling alley in Somerville, Massachusetts, is probed.
83	6	"Titanic Terror"	Atlanta, Georgia – Georgia Aquarium Titanic exhibit Covington, Georgia – Gaither Plantation	April 15, 2009	2.940
TAPS go to Atlanta to conduct a probe of the Georgia Aquarium, where paranormal phenomena have been linked to an exhibit of artifacts from the ill-fated RMS Titanic.
84	7	"Crossing Over"	Whitefield, New Hampshire – The Spalding Inn	April 22, 2009	3.000
The GHI team helps Jason and Grant probe the Spalding Inn in Whitefield, New Hampshire (Jason and Grant's new property), which is purportedly haunted by a child's apparition and a figure that watches people on the grounds from the windows.
85	8	"Garden State Asylum"	Cedar Grove, New Jersey – Essex County Sanitorium	April 29, 2009	N/A
TAPS members visit Newark, New Jersey, to probe an abandoned hospital and psychiatric facility, where disembodied screams and sightings of a spectral nurse have been reported.
86	9	"Inhuman Entity"	Blackstone, Massachusetts – Ladouceur House; Prince William County, Virginia – Brentsville Historical Centre	August 19, 2009	N/A
A Massachusetts home is probed, resulting in what appears to be a spectral attack on Jason.
87	10	"I Am Not Guilty"	Waldorf, Maryland – Samuel Mudd House; Charles City, Virginia – Edgewood Plantation	August 26, 2009	N/A
Maryland's Samuel Mudd House, noted for its link to Abraham Lincoln's assassin, John Wilkes Booth; Virginia's Edgewood Plantation, the home of Presidents William Henry Harrison and Benjamin Harrison.
88	11	"Civil War Spirits"	Chadds Ford, Pennsylvania – Thornbury farm Alexandria, Virginia – Lee-Fendall House	September 2, 2009	2.800
The team visits Chadds Ford, Pennsylvania, to probe a ranch that was built on a Revolutionary War battlefield. Also: the Lee-Fendall House, the former home of members of Robert E. Lee's extended family, is investigated.
89	12	"Essex County Penitentiary"	North Caldwell, New Jersey – Essex County Penitentiary	September 9, 2009	2.633
Josh Gates from Destination Truth helps the team search for the ghosts of inmates in New Jersey's Essex County Jail. (With guest investigator Josh Gates from Destination Truth.)
90	13	"Judgment Day"	Elizabeth, New Jersey – Union County Courthouse; Hopkinton, New Hampshire – MacNeil residence	September 16, 2009	N/A
Garden State ghost hunter Bruce Tango helps the team probe the Union County Courthouse in Elizabeth, New Jersey. Also: a 19th-century home is investigated in Hopkinton, New Hampshire.
91	14	"Little Drummer Boy"	Staten Island, New York – Church of St. Andrews; Chicago, Illinois – Benton residence	September 23, 2009	N/A
Claims concerning a spectral drummer at the historic Church of St. Andrews are investigated in Staten Island, New York. Also: the teams visits Chicago's Benton House, a community center allegedly possessed by angry spirits.
92	15	"A Bat Out of Hell"	Thousand Islands, New York – Isle of Pines (Note: This location was picked as part of the 2008 Great American Ghost Hunt contest.)	September 30, 2009	2.900
Rocker Meat Loaf assists the team on a probe of an allegedly haunted, private island in Thousand Islands, New York. (Featuring guest celebrity investigator Meat Loaf.)
93	16	"Glimmer Men"	Quincy, Massachusetts – USS Salem; Cornwall, Ontario – Cornwall Jail	October 7, 2009	N/A
The team investigates claims of disembodied voices and shadowy apparitions aboard the USS Salem in Quincy, Massachusetts. Also: Cornwall Jail is probed in Ontario, Canada.
94	17	"Fort Henry"	Kingston, Ontario – Fort Henry	October 14, 2009	2.900
The team goes to Kingston, Ontario, to probe paranormal claims concerning Fort Henry, a 19th-century military complex that later served as a POW camp for Nazis captured during World War II.
95	18	"Congress Theater"	Chicago, Illinois – Congress Theater	October 21, 2009	3.100
Chicago's Congress Theater is probed regarding claims of floating apparitions and arguments between disembodied voices.
96	19	"Rocky Mountain Hauntings"	Manitou Springs, Colorado – Briarhurst Manor (Note: This location was picked as part of the 2008 Great American Ghost Hunt contest.)	October 28, 2009	3.060
The team journeys to Manitou Springs, Colorado, to probe Briarhurst Manor, where a ghostly child and a skeletal female specter are said to lurk.
97	20	"Ghost of Buffalo Bill"	Golden, Colorado – Buffalo Bill Museum; Eatonton, Georgia – Oakland Hall	November 4, 2009	N/A
The ghost of Buffalo Bill is sought by TAPS and actor Eddie McClintock (Warehouse 13) in Golden, Colorado. Also: Eatonton, Georgia, is visited for a probe of Oakland Hall.
98	21	"New Hampshire Gothic"	Fitzwilliam, New Hampshire – Amos Blake House; Pensacola, Florida – Arbona Building	November 11, 2009	2.914
TAPS probes the Amos J. Blake House Museum in Fitzwilliam, New Hampshire, regarding claims of self-activating toys, the apparition of a young boy, and a phantom cat. Also: the team visits Pensacola, Florida, to investigate the historic Arbona Building, where employees say they have been harassed by disembodied guests.
99	22	"Pensacola Lighthouse"	Pensacola, Florida – Pensacola Light	November 18, 2009	2.597
Florida's Pensacola Lighthouse is probed regarding tales of a woman's ghost that have been passed down for generations, claims linked to transparent people and accounts in which lights have turned off and on by themselves.
100	23	"Mark Twain House"	Hartford, Connecticut – Mark Twain House	December 2, 2009	2.436
The team visits Hartford, Connecticut, to probe the home of author Mark Twain, where sightings of full-bodied apparitions and the laughter of a ghostly child have been reported.
101	24	"Unexplained Phenomena"	Willow Grove, Pennsylvania – American Legion Post; Hartford, Connecticut – Old State House	December 9, 2009	N/A
The team probes an 18th-century farmhouse in Willow Grove, Pennsylvania, where spirits allegedly play with the lights and cast large, dark shadows. Also: the Old State House in Hartford, Connecticut, is investigated regarding claims of disembodied voices and phantom footfalls.
102	25	"Hindenburg Crash Site"	Lakehurst, New Jersey – Lakehurst Naval Air Station (Hindenburg crash site)	December 16, 2009	2.540
The Hindenburg crash site is probed in Lakehurst, New Jersey.

=== Season 6 (2010) ===
No. overall	No. in season	Title	Location(s)	Original release date	U.S. viewers (millions)
103	1	"Alcatraz"	San Francisco, California – Alcatraz Island	March 3, 2010	2.410
The team probes the notorious former prison Alcatraz Island in the sixth-season premiere with the help of Dustin Pari and Barry Fitzgerald from "Ghost Hunters International." Josh Gates (Destination Truth) hosts. (2-hour, season premiere, TAPS reviews their 100th televised investigation before a live, studio audience at 30 Rockefeller Plaza in New York City).
104	2	"Fort Ticonderoga"	Ticonderoga, New York – Fort Ticonderoga	March 10, 2010	N/A
Historic Fort Ticonderoga is probed in New York regarding claims of chatty spirits that converse in French and English and sounds of a ghostly infantry.
105	3	"Shamrock Spirits"	New York City, New York – Paddy Reilly's Pub; Hartford, Connecticut – Harriet Beecher Stowe House	March 17, 2010	2.106
Paddy Reilly's Irish pub is investigated in New York City regarding apparition sightings. Also: the team probes intimidating rooms in the Harriet Beecher Stowe House in Hartford, Connecticut.
106	4	"Spirits of Jersey"	Atlantic City, New Jersey – Absecon Lighthouse; Asbury Park, New Jersey – Stephen Crane House	March 24, 2010	2.039
The team explores the Absecon Lighthouse and the Asbury Park in New Jersey.
107	5	"Touched By Evil"	Cape May, New Jersey – Southern Mansion	March 31, 2010	2.309
Based on a recommendation from Tango's father Bruce, the team probes the Southern Mansion in Cape May, New Jersey, where the original owner's daughter may be haunting the grounds along with other apparitions.
108	6	"Haunted Reform School"	Ione, California – Preston Castle	April 7, 2010	N/A
The team visits Ione, Cal., to probe Preston Castle, an early reform school for boys, where a ghost seems to get personal with Grant.
109	7	"Ghosts in the Attic"	Plymouth County, Massachusetts – Grzelak residence Mine Hill, New Jersey – NJ Bar & Grill	April 14, 2010	2.154
A Plymouth County, Massachusetts, residence is probed regarding claims of violent paranormal encounters. Also: the ghost of a murdered patron is sought in a New Jersey bar and grill.
110	8	"Inn of the Dead"	Orleans, Massachusetts – Orleans Inn	April 21, 2010	2.266
The team visits Cape Cod, Massachusetts, to probe claims concerning the Orleans Inn.
111	9	"Spirits of the Night"	Bellingham, Massachusetts – Scully residence	April 28, 2010	2.415
A Massachusetts home is probed regarding claims of phantom footfalls, eerie whispering and a ghostly presence in the son's room.
112	10	"Norwich State"	Preston, Connecticut – Norwich State Hospital	May 5, 2010	2.332
Jason, Grant and the rest of the TAPS team get an opportunity they have been waiting years for: a chance to investigate Norwich State Hospital in Connecticut.
113	11	"Haunted Hotel"	Cooperstown, New York – Otesaga Hotel	August 25, 2010	1.832
The TAPS team heads to Cooperstown, New York, for a chilling investigation of a world-class hotel.
114	12	"America's First Zoo"	Philadelphia, Pennsylvania – Philadelphia Zoo	September 1, 2010	2.176
The team visits America's first zoo, in Philadelphia, where they venture into underground passages and eerie buildings to conduct a paranormal investigation.
115	13	"Uninvited Guests"	Tilton, New Hampshire – 1875 Inn; Oxford, New Jersey – Shippen Manor	September 8, 2010	2.013
The team goes to New Hampshire to probe the 1875 Inn, the site of tragic fires. Civil War–era apparitions are sought in New Jersey's Shippen Manor.
116	14	"A Shot in the Dark"	Concord, Massachusetts – The Colonial Inn	September 15, 2010	1.875
The Colonial Inn in Concord, Massachusetts, which is said to have housed wounded and dying soldiers during the Revolutionary War.
117	15	"Signals From the Past"	Newport, Rhode Island – Rose Island; Cooperstown, New York – National Baseball Hall of Fame	September 22, 2010	2.084
The team visits Rose Island off Newport, Rhode Island, where guests have reported hearing disembodied voices and doors seem to slam shut by themselves. Also: the National Baseball Hall of Fame in Cooperstown, New York.
118	16	"Lemp Mansion"	St. Louis, Missouri – Lemp Mansion	September 29, 2010	2.082
The TAPS crew heads to the notoriously haunted Lemp Mansion in St. Louis.
119	17	"Grammar School Ghosts"	Alton, Illinois – Milton School	October 6, 2010	2.006
An abandoned elementary school is probed.
120	18	"It's Time To Get Touched"	Columbus, Ohio – Thurber House; Saratoga Springs, New York – Canfield Casino	October 13, 2010	1.678
The home of author James Thurber is probed in Columbus, Ohio.
121	19	"The Chopping Block"	Mansfield, Ohio – Bissman Building	October 20, 2010	2.207
Employees believe that violent ghosts are haunting their Ohio workplace.
122	20	"The Oldest House In Georgia"	Kingston, New York – Old Ulster County Jail; Stone Mountain, Georgia – Antebellum Plantation	October 27, 2010	1.968
Spectral voices and phantom footfalls are investigated in Georgia's Thornton House.
123	21	"Home Is Where the Heart Is"	Little Falls, New York – Beardslee Castle (Note: This location was part of the 2008 Great American Ghost Hunt contest.); Savannah, Georgia – Olson residence	November 3, 2010	1.812
Reports of phantom footfalls, spectral singers and other strange sounds are investigated at Beardslee Castle in Utica, New York.
124	22	"Empire State Haunt"	Lake George, New York – Fort William Henry; Buffalo, New York – Buffalo Central Terminal (revisit) (Note: This was a review of the 2010 Ghost Hunters Live Buffalo Central Terminal investigation.)	November 10, 2010	1.461
Ghost Hunters Academy winner Adam Berry helps the team probe Fort William Henry in Lake George, New York. Also: Jason and Grant reveal their findings from the Halloween investigation of Buffalo Central Terminal.
125	23	"Sloss Furnaces"	Birmingham, Alabama – Sloss Furnaces	November 17, 2010	1.755
Rock legend Meat Loaf helps the team probe Sloss Furnaces in Birmingham, Ala., where the spirits of former factory employees may lurk. (With return guest investigator Meat Loaf.)
126	24	"TAPS Meets the Real Housewives of Atlanta"	Atlanta, Georgia – Rhodes Hall	December 1, 2010	1.875
The team seeks the ghost of the man who built Rhodes Hall with help from "The Real Housewives of Atlanta."
127	25	"Ghosts of Christmas Past"	Jackson, New Hampshire – Christmas Farm Inn; Schoharie, New York – Old Stone Fort	December 8, 2010	1.703
The Christmas Farm Inn in Jackson, New Hampshire, and the Old Stone Fort in Schoharie, New York, are probed.

=== Season 7 (2011) ===
No. overall	No. in season	Title	Location(s)	Original release date	U.S. viewers (millions)
128	1	"Haunted Town"	Alexandria, Louisiana Hotel Bentley; Finnegans Wake; Diamond Grill	February 23, 2011	1.745
The ghost of a hotel owner is sought, and probes of a tavern and a jewelry shop-turned-restaurant unfold in Alexandria, Louisiana, in the Season 7 premiere. (note: This was an investigation of three sites in Alexandria per the city's request. The results were presented at Alexandria Town Hall in a town hall format.)
129	2	"Pennsylvania Asylum"	Chester County, Pennsylvania – Pennhurst Asylum	March 2, 2011	1.481
A shadowy figure and moaning voices allegedly lurk in Pennsylvania's Pennhurst asylum.
130	3	"Century of Hauntings"	Oxford, Massachusetts – Voas residence Philadelphia, Pennsylvania – USS Olympia	March 9, 2011	1.440
The crew heads to Massachusetts to help the Voas family and find human remains; Philadelphia's USS Olympia warship.
131	4	"French Quarter Phantoms"	New Orleans, Louisiana – Old U.S. Mint	March 16, 2011	1.690
A trip to New Orleans has TAPS probing an old U.S. mint, which was the site of a Civil War execution.
132	5	"Hotel Haunts Unleashed"	Rapid City, South Dakota – Hotel Alex Johnson	March 23, 2011	1.601
The ghost of a suicidal bride is sought during a probe of the Hotel Alex Johnson in Rapid City, S.D., and a ghost-hunting dog makes her debut.
133	6	"Frozen in Fear"	Mackinac Island, Michigan – Mission Point Resort	March 30, 2011	1.800
Visiting Mackinac Island, Michigan, where a student allegedly committed suicide.
134	7	"Residual Haunts"	Prospect, Maine – Fort Knox; Macclesfield, North Carolina – Ferrell residence	April 6, 2011	1.478
Fort Knox is probed in Maine regarding claims of an evil presence. Also: a family's home is investigated in North Carolina.
135	8	"Knights of the Living Dead"	Worcester, Massachusetts – Higgins Armory Museum	April 13, 2011	1.486
Higgins Armory Museum is investigated in Worcester, Massachusetts.
136	9	"A Soldier's Story"	Derby, Connecticut – Sterling Opera House; Fayetteville, North Carolina – Rivers residence	April 20, 2011	1.509
A Connecticut opera house is probed.
137	10	"Pearl Harbor Phantoms"	Honolulu, Hawaii – Pacific Aviation Museum (Hangar 37 and Hangar 79)	June 1, 2011	1.491
The Pacific Aviation Museum Pearl Harbor is probed with Josh Gates (Destination Truth).
138	11	"Urgent"	Honolulu, Hawaii – Pacific Aviation Museum (Hangar 37 and Hangar 79) (Note: Review of evidence from prior episode, "Pearl Harbor Phantoms."); Woonsocket, Rhode Island – Reid residence	August 24, 2011	1.652
A family's urgent call for help brings the team to a Rhode Island house, where the ghost of an old man is said to be lurking in the kitchen and a mysterious black cat has been sighted in the living room.
139	12	"Hill View Manor"	New Castle, Pennsylvania – Hill View Manor	August 31, 2011	1.274
Probing a former New Castle, Pennsylvania, nursing home, where a ghostly little boy is reputed to have visited patients just days before their deaths and disembodied screams have been heard.
140	13	"Dark Shadows"	Newport, Rhode Island – Seaview Terrace	September 7, 2011	1.442
TAPS is summoned to Newport, Rhode Island, to investigate Seaview Terrace, the setting for the gothic soap-opera, Dark Shadows, where a door handle is said to have turned on its own and seemingly inexplicable footsteps and banging have been heard.
141	14	"Ghostly Evidence"	Townsend, Massachusetts – Townsend Historical Society (Reed Homestead and Spaulding Cooperage); Mechanicsville, Maryland – Summerseat Farm	September 14, 2011	1.557
Sightings attributed to the ghost of a grieving mother are investigated at the Reed Homestead in Townsend, Massachusetts.
142	15	"Ghosts of Carnegie"	Homestead, Pennsylvania – Carnegie Library; Homestead, Pennsylvania – Homestead Police Station	September 21, 2011	1.344
Probing Pittsburgh's historic Carnegie Library, where doors seem to slam shut on their own and apparitions and disembodied voices have been encountered.
143	16	"Harvesting Murder"	Waipahu, Hawaii – Hawaii's Plantation Village; Lenox, Massachusetts – Ventfort Hall	September 28, 2011	1.754
The team probes Hawaii's Plantation Village in Waipahu regarding sightings of a ghostly girl and possibly haunted artifacts.
144	17	"Well of Horror"	Napanoch, New York – Shanley Hotel; Youngstown, New York – Old Fort Niagara	October 5, 2011	1.964
Jason's daughter, Haily, helps the team investigate a historic fort and a prominent hotel
145	18	"Roasts and Ghosts"	New York City, New York – New York Friars' Club; Rochester, New York – Main Street Armory	October 12, 2011	1.586
The Friars Club in New York City is probed.
146	19	"Stage Fright"	Niagara Falls, New York – The Rapids Theatre	October 19, 2011	1.548
Claims attributed to a ghostly actress are investigated during a probe of the Rapids Theatre in Niagara Falls, New York.
147	20	"Murdered Matron"	Staten Island, New York – Sailors' Snug Harbor	October 26, 2011	1.721
Meredith Vieira (host of Dateline NBC and Who Wants to Be a Millionaire?) helps the team probe Sailors' Snug Harbor, a former retirement facility for seamen, in Staten Island, New York.
148	21	"The Bloodiest 47 Acres"	Jefferson City, Missouri – Missouri State Penitentiary	November 2, 2011	1.789
Spectral inmates are sought at Missouri State Penitentiary in Jefferson City.
149	22	"Voices of Pain"	Louisville, Kentucky – Waverly Hills Sanatorium (revisit #2)	November 9, 2011	1.694
Louisville's Waverly Hills Sanatorium is revisited for a probe of the nurses' wing.
150	23	"Distillery of Spirits"	Frankfort, Kentucky – Buffalo Trace Distillery; Wilder, Kentucky – Bobby Mackey's Music World	November 16, 2011	1.597
The team visits Kentucky to probe a distillery where the ghost of a colonel may lurk and to investigate a nightclub with a grim past.
151	24	"Membership Denied"	Hartford, Connecticut – Hartford Elks Lodge #19; Morse Mill, Missouri – Morse Mill Hotel	November 30, 2011	1.673
Probing Connecticut's Hartford Elks Lodge #19, where doors are said to jiggle on their own and phantom voices have been heard. Also: Missouri's Morse Mill Hotel is investigated.
152	25	"Christmas Spirit"	Bethlehem, Pennsylvania Sun Inn; Hanoverville Roadhouse	December 7, 2011	1.593
A probe in Bethlehem, Pennsylvania, unfolds.

=== Season 8 (2012) ===
No. overall	No. in season	Title	Location(s)	Original release date	U.S. viewers (millions)
153	1	"Roller Ghoster"	Mason, Ohio – Kings Island Amusement Park; Antrim, New Hampshire — Antrim residence	January 11, 2012	2.029
Ohio's Kings Island amusement park is probed regarding claims about a ghostly girl. Also: a family's home in Antrim, New Hampshire, is investigated in the Season 8 premiere.
154	2	"Buyer Beware"	Naples, New York – Naples Hotel; Gardner, Massachusetts – Gardner Mansion (revisit) (Note: This was a return investigation to the Veau residence from Season 3's "Whispers & Voices" episode.)	January 18, 2012	1.534
A hotel in Naples, New York, is probed for activity that may be linked to a suicide; an allegedly haunted home in Gardner, Massachusetts, is visited.
155	3	"Flooded Souls"	Haletown, Tennessee – Hales Bar Dam	January 25, 2012	1.734
An underwater graveyard that was submerged after a dam broke is investigated in Tennessee.
156	4	"Dead & Breakfast"	Red Boiling Springs, Tennessee – Thomas House	February 1, 2012	2.053
A Tennessee bed-and-breakfast may be haunted.
157	5	"Moonshine & Madness"	Max Meadows, Virginia – Major Graham Mansion	February 8, 2012	2.070
The Major Graham Mansion is probed in Virginia.
158	6	"City Hell"	Providence, Rhode Island – Providence City Hall; Farmington, New York – Burson residence	February 15, 2012	2.200
Visiting Rhode Island to probe Providence City Hall. Also: a historic house in Farmington, New York, is investigated.
159	7	"Frighternity"	Kingston, Rhode Island – University of Rhode Island (Lambda Chi Alpha frathouse); Baltimore, Maryland – USCGC Taney	April 11, 2012	1.626
The Lambda Chi fraternity house at the University of Rhode Island is investigated; the USCGC Taney is probed in Baltimore.
160	8	"A Ghost of a Marine"	Annapolis, Maryland – U.S. Naval Institute	April 18, 2012	1.349
Probing the U.S. Naval Institute in Annapolis, Md., regarding claims attributed to a ghostly marine.
161	9	"A Family of Spirits"	Mount Joy, Pennsylvania – Bube's Brewery; Reisterstown, Maryland – Boston residence	April 25, 2012	1.516
Probing Bube's Brewery in Mount Joy, Pennsylvania. Also: a purported haunting is investigated in a woman's Reisterstown, Md., home.
162	10	"Haunted By Heroes"	Mt. Pleasant, South Carolina – USS Yorktown	May 2, 2012	1.453
Purported paranormal activity is investigated on the USS Yorktown.
163	11	"The Princess and the EVP"	Bretton Woods, New Hampshire – Mount Washington Resort (revisit)	May 9, 2012	1.521
The ghost of a princess is sought during a return trip to a New Hampshire resort.
164	12	"Please Sign the Ghostbook"	Whitefield, New Hampshire – The Spalding Inn (revisit)	May 16, 2012	1.812
The final day has arrived – it's Grant Wilson's last investigation with TAPS. And where better to close out his phenomenal run but at Jason and Grant's very own haunted property, Spalding Inn.
165	13	"A Serial Killer's Revenge"	Charleston, South Carolina – Old Charleston Jail (Note: This location was the winner of TAPS' "America's Hometown Ghost Hunter Contest".)	September 5, 2012	1.910
The Old City Jail in Charleston, South Carolina, is investigated.
166	14	"Camp Fear"	Morgan County, Georgia – Camp Rutledge; Marion, North Carolina – Leverette residence	September 12, 2012	1.536
A camp in Georgia is investigated; a family's home in Marion, North Carolina, is probed.
167	15	"French Quarter Massacre"	New Orleans, Louisiana – Jimani Lounge; New Orleans, Louisiana – The Mortuary and Mandeville Cemetery	September 19, 2012	1.746
A trip to New Orleans includes a probe of the site of a fatal fire. Also: visits to a mortuary and a cemetery where some of the victims were taken.
168	16	"Don't Feed the Apparition"	Alexandria, Louisiana – Alexandria Zoological Park	September 26, 2012	1.658
Strange goings-on at Louisiana's Alexandria Zoo are investigated; and a new member joins the team.
169	17	"Ghostly Refuge"	Oswego, New York – Fort Ontario	October 3, 2012	1.539
TAPS travels to Oswego, New York, to investigate reports of paranormal activity at Fort Ontario, which during World War II served as home to Jewish refugees.
170	18	"Paranormal Politics"	Baton Rouge, Louisiana – Old State Capitol; Charleston, South Carolina – Magnolia Plantation	October 10, 2012	1.694
The Civil War and a congressman's death are part of the history the team uncovers when they visit Louisiana's Old State Capitol, a Gothic castle-like building in Baton Rouge. Later, owners of a plantation in Charleston, South Carolina, try to contact a relative who died in an accident on the property in the early 1800s.
171	19	"Curtain Call"	Joliet, Illinois - Rialto Square Theatre	October 17, 2012	1.809
The guys investigate strange goings-on reported at the historic Rialto Square Theatre in Joliet, Illinois.
172	20	"Fear Factory"	Claremont, New Hampshire – Topstone Mill; Rockford, Illinois – Tinker Cottage	October 24, 2012	1.680
A former shoe and furniture factory in Claremont, New Hampshire, is investigated.
173	21	"Tunnels of Terror"	Lockport, New York – Lockport Caves; Skaneateles, New York – Fuller House	October 31, 2012	1.599
The team explore an underworld of tunnels in Lockport, New York, and uncover stories of a possible murder, numerous deaths and strange goings-on.
174	22	"Heir Apparition"	Hampton Falls, New Hampshire – Governor's Mansion; Tompkinsville, Kentucky – Tooley Residence	November 7, 2012	1.651
While investigating the Governor's Mansion in Hampton Falls, New Hampshire, the team dig up information about a little boy who is rumored to have been the secret child of a former senator.
175	23	"Paranormal Pioneers"	Gloucester, Massachusetts – Hammond Castle	November 14, 2012	1.406
Josh Gates (Destination Truth) lends a hand to the team when they travel to Gloucester, Massachusetts, to investigate Hammond Castle and its original owners.
176	24	"Higher Dead-ucation"	Bowling Green, Kentucky – Western Kentucky University	November 21, 2012	1.339
The team visit Western Kentucky University in Bowling Green, Ky.
177	25	"Due Date With Death"	Rochester, New York – Rochester Public Library	November 28, 2012	1.546
The team travel to Rochester to investigate whether a public library is haunted.
178	26	"Haunted Home for the Holidays"	Hartford, Connecticut – Mark Twain House (revisit)	December 5, 2012	1.329
The team return to the Mark Twain House and Museum in Hartford, Connecticut, at Christmastime to check out ghostly claims.

=== Season 9 (2013–14) ===
No. overall	No. in season	Title	Location(s)	Original release date	U.S. viewers (millions)
179	1	"Hollywood Horror Stories"	Los Angeles, California Sowden House; Madame Tussauds Hollywood	January 16, 2013	1.224
In the ninth-season premiere, the team travel to the Sowden House in Los Angeles, which is the alleged site of the infamous 1947 Black Dahlia murder mystery. They also examine the 1979 death of actor Victor Kilian during a visit to Madame Tussauds Hollywood wax museum.
180	2	"Ghost Mission"	San Juan Capistrano, California – Mission San Juan Capistrano	January 23, 2013	1.208
The guys are given special access to investigate strange goings-on at a historic mission in San Juan Capistrano, Cal. (with guest investigator Josh Gates of Destination Truth.)
181	3	"Prescription For Fear"	Bartonville, Illinois – Peoria Asylum	January 30, 2013	1.294
Renovations at the Peoria Asylum in Bartonville, Illinois, are slowed down by strange occurrences, which are investigated by the team.
182	4	"Permanent Residents"	Cortland, New York – 1890 House; Coles County, Illinois – Ashmore Estates	February 6, 2013	1.294
An investigation into the 1890 House in Cortland, New York, delves into the background of the mansion's original owner, businessman Chester F. Wickwire, and his ancestors.
183	5	"All Ghosts On Deck"	Louisville, Kentucky – Belle of Louisville	February 13, 2013	1.113
The team travel to Louisville to investigate one of the oldest operating steamboats in the United States.
184	6	"Ghosts From Hale"	Coventry, Connecticut – Nathan Hale Homestead; Floyds Knobs, Indiana – Hoffman Residence	February 20, 2013	1.187
The Nathan Hale Homestead in Coventry, Connecticut, is investigated.
185	7	"Scream Park"	Sylvan Beach, New York – Sylvan Beach Amusement Park	February 27, 2013	1.365
The team investigate paranormal activity being reported by the new owner of an amusement park in Sylvan Beach, New York.
186	8	"The Ghost Hasn't Left the Building"	Shreveport, Louisiana – Shreveport Municipal Auditorium	June 12, 2013	1.353
The team travel to Louisiana to investigate the Shreveport Municipal Auditorium, a National Historic Landmark where famous singers like Elvis Presley and Johnny Cash got their start.
187	9	"Ghost Friends Forever"	Little Rock, Arkansas – Jones Residence	June 19, 2013	1.534
A Little Rock family believe a bungalow that they inherited is cursed.
188	10	"Vintage Spirits"	Liberty, Missouri – Belvoir Winery	June 26, 2013	1.669
Reports of paranormal activity at the Belvoir Winery in Liberty, Mo., are investigated.
189	11	"Hoover Damned"	Boulder City, Nevada – Boulder City Hospital	July 10, 2013	1.454
The team investigates the Boulder City Hospital in Nevada, which was built to serve the men building Hoover Dam during the Depression years.
190	12	"Something in the Water"	Excelsior Springs, Missouri – Elms Resort and Spa	July 17, 2013	1.437
The Elms Hotel and Spa in Excelsior Springs, Mo., is investigated by the team.
191	13	"Undying Love"	Monticello, Arkansas – Allen Mansion	October 9, 2013	1.605
The team travel to Monticello, Ark., to investigate a mansion where, according to legend, a woman committed suicide over an ill-fated and secret love.
192	14	"The Coroner's Case"	Shreveport, Louisiana – Rendall Building; Shreveport, Louisiana – Caddo Parish Courthouse	October 16, 2013	1.424
The team investigate terrifying claims of paranormal activity at the Rendall Building in Shreveport, Louisiana.
193	15	"Shock Island"	Scott Township, Pennsylvania – Pennsylvania Asylum and Testing Lab; Block Island, Rhode Island – Surf Hotel and Cyr House	October 23, 2013	1.458
The team investigate the Pennsylvania Asylum and Testing Lab in Scott Township, Pennsylvania.
194	16	"Hyde and Seek (Note: special episode title: Ghost Hunters Halloween)"	Cooperstown, New York – Hyde Hall	October 30, 2013	1.414
For Halloween, the team head to Hyde Hall in Cooperstown, New York, to investigate alleged paranormal activity.
195	17	"Orphans of Gettysburg"	Gettysburg, Pennsylvania – Jennie Wade House	January 22, 2014	1.501
The team travel to Pennsylvania to commemorate the 150th anniversary of the Battle of Gettysburg and visit a former orphanage with a history of ghostly sightings.
196	18	"Phantom Fleet"	Buffalo, New York – Buffalo and Erie County Naval & Military Park	January 29, 2014	1.329
Michelle's last case with the team takes her to a naval park in Buffalo to investigate three former service vessels that are alleged to be haunted.
197	19	"Don't Forget About Us"	Franklin, Kentucky – Octagon Hall; Memphis, Tennessee – Woodruff-Fontaine House	February 5, 2014	1.036
The TAPS team go underground during a trip to Octagon Hall in Franklin, Ky., to investigate secret tunnels, which were allegedly used to hide Confederate soldiers during the Civil War.
198	20	"Family Plot"	Lucas, Ohio Ceely Rose House; Bromfield Estate	February 12, 2014	1.264
The TAPS team visit Lucas, Ohio, where they investigate the 1896 case of a woman who killed her entire family, and explore the home of a Pulitzer Prize-winning author.
199	21	"Dead Presidents"	King George, Virginia – Belle Grove Plantation; Winchester, Virginia – Historic Jordan Springs	February 19, 2014	1.256
The team travel to Frederick County, Va., for an investigation, during which they examine the famous people and events associated with the Belle Grove Plantation. Later, they believe two eras of ghosts are inhabiting the Historic Jordan Springs Estate.
200	22	"Nine Men's Misery"	Cumberland, Rhode Island – Cumberland Library and Monastery	February 26, 2014	1.217
The team travel to Cumberland, Rhode Island, to investigate an old monastery, which is now a public library, and rumored to be haunted.
201	23	"An Officer And An Apparition"	Brunswick, Georgia – Brunswick City Hall; Woonsocket, Rhode Island – Jules Desurmont Worsted Company Mill	October 8, 2014	1.170
The TAPS team celebrate their 10th anniversary when they travel to the Old City Hall in Brunswick, Georgia, to investigate claims that a person who died during a 19th-century shooting is haunting the premises today.
202	24	"A Textbook Case"	Barnegat, New Jersey – Elizabeth V. Edwards Elementary School; Green Cove Springs, Florida – Old Clay County Courthouse & Jail	October 15, 2014	1.093
The TAPS team explore an abandoned school in Barnegat, New Jersey, looking into reports that the apparition of a beloved teacher who died in 1965 is luring children inside the building. Later, they arrive in Clay County, Florida, on a mission to discover if an old courthouse and jail is haunted by the ghosts of inmates and a murdered sheriff.
203	25	"The 200th Episode: Grant is Back"	Weston, West Virginia – Trans-Allegheny Lunatic Asylum (revisit)	October 22, 2014	1.317
TAPS return to the Trans-Allegheny Lunatic Asylum in Weston, West Virginia, for their 200th episode, which finds the team reunited with Grant, Dustin and Joe.(the latter both from GHI) Included: Efforts are made to reach former patients who suffered tragic lives in the hospital.
204	26	"Phantoms of the Opera (Note: special episode title: Ghost Hunters Halloween)"	Cincinnati, Ohio – Cincinnati Music Hall	October 29, 2014	1.181
In the Season 9 finale, the TAPS team celebrate Halloween as they investigate reports of paranormal activity at the Cincinnati Music Hall in Ohio.

=== Season 10 (2015) ===
No. overall	No. in season	Title	Location(s)	Original release date	U.S. viewers (millions)
205	1	"Barrels of Boos"	Lawrenceburg, Kentucky – Wild Turkey Distillery	August 26, 2015	1.011
In the Season 10 premiere, the Wild Turkey Distillery in Kentucky is investigated by TAPS, who look for traces of the ghosts of the founding family members. (with guest investigator Kristen Luman from Ghost Mine)
206	2	"Too Many Apparitions in the Kitchen"	Hyde Park, New York – Culinary Institute of America	September 2, 2015	1.151
The TAPS team investigate the Culinary Institute of America in Hyde Park, New York, for signs of the spirits of Jesuit priests who once lived, worked and were buried on the CIA campus. (investigator Kristen Luman of Ghost Mine is back with the team)
207	3	"Last Will and Evidence"	Glen Spey, New York – Burn Brae Mansion; Norwalk, Connecticut – Gallaher Mansion/Cranbury Park	September 9, 2015	0.866
A bride-to-be asks the TAPS team for help determining whether her dream wedding venue in Glen Spey, New York, is safe. Later, a trip to Gallaher Mansion in Connecticut to investigate an increase in reported paranormal activity. (Ghost Mines Kristen Luman joins them for her last investigation with the team)
208	4	"Over My Dead Body"	St. Charles, Missouri – St. Charles Main Street	September 16, 2015	0.949
A trip to St. Charles, Mo., to investigate the historic Main Street finds the team trying to determine whether buildings constructed over a cemetery could be the reason why people experience unnerving sightings.
209	5	"Fright at the Opera"	Carthage, Missouri – Burlingame & Chaffee Opera House; Fairfield, Connecticut – Eberlin residence	September 23, 2015	1.135
The team investigate the Burlingame and Chaffee Opera House in Carthage, Mo.; and they visit a private residence in Connecticut to help a family who believe a presence has taken over their home and children.
210	6	"There Ghosts the Neighborhood"	Barnstable, Massachusetts – Barnstable House and Beechwood Inn; Joplin, Missouri – Holly Hill Estate (Willow Vista and Jameson-Pinkard Home on Patterson property)	September 30, 2015	1.085
TAPS travel to Missouri to help three generations of a family living on what they believe to be a haunted estate; and in Massachusetts, the team investigate whether one ghost is connected to two different properties.
211	7	"The Plot Thickens"	Woonsocket, Rhode Island – Stadium Theatre and Stadium Building	October 7, 2015	0.731
The TAPS team travel to Woonsocket, Rhode Island, to investigate a theater owner's claim that spirits are traveling between two buildings.
212	8	"Fortress of Phantoms"	Newport, Rhode Island – Fort Adams	October 14, 2015	0.722
The team travel to Fort Adams in Newport, Rhode Island, where they investigate three deadly events, none of which involved battle casualties.
213	9	"Houghton Hears a Who?"	North Adams, Massachusetts – Houghton Mansion	October 21, 2015	0.895
The team investigate Houghton Mansion in North Adams, Massachusetts, where they suspect unexplained phenomena on the property relates back to a deadly car accident.
214	10	"Darker Learning"	Bennington, Vermont – Southern Vermont College (Edward Everett Mansion and campus dormitories)	October 28, 2015	0.902
The team investigate a college in Bennington, Vt.., after hearing reports of frightening paranormal activity, which they trace back to the legend of a mysterious love triangle and suicides.
215	11	"Innocent Until Proven Dead"	Louisville, Kentucky – Conrad-Caldwell House Museum; Carlisle, Pennsylvania – Old Cumberland County Prison	November 4, 2015	0.702
TAPS arrive in Louisville to investigate whether a trio's ancestors still inhabit their property; and in Pennsylvania, the team work to solve a hanging in the Old Cumberland County Prison. (with guest investigator from Massachusetts, Shari Ventura.)
216	12	"Rockets Red Scare"	Boston, Massachusetts – USS Constitution; Harrodsburg, Kentucky – Old Fort Harrod State Park	November 11, 2015	0.627
TAPS investigate the USS Constitution, the famous ship better known as "Old Ironsides," during a trip to Boston. Later, they meet historical reenacters in Kentucky who claim they have encountered spirits of early settlers in Old Fort Harrod State Park. (with guest investigator Shari Ventura.)
217	13	"1st Edition Apparition"	Lenox, Massachusetts – The Mount (Edith Wharton residence; revisit)	November 18, 2015	0.626
Season 10 concludes with a trip back to the Mount, Edith Wharton's home in Lenox, Massachusetts, to investigate reports of increased paranormal activity since TAPS last visited in 2008. (with guest investigator Shari Ventura.)

=== Season 11 (2016) ===
No. overall	No. in season	Title	Location(s)	Original release date	U.S. viewers (millions)
218	1	"All Aboard The Ghost Train"	Cleveland, Ohio – Midwest Railway Preservation Society	August 3, 2016	0.702
In the Season 11 premiere, TAPS travel to Cleveland to investigate a historic roundhouse and rail yard, which they discover is connected to more than just old trains. Their findings include the frightening remnants of a serial killer, horrific accidents and a terrible crash.
219	2	"Ghost Guards"	Cleveland, Ohio – Grays Armory	August 10, 2016	0.572
A ghostly mystery is investigated in an armory that has been standing for more than 100 years. TAPS conclude that female leadership coincides with increased paranormal activity and that either outraged deceased members or the death of an employee could be the reason behind it.
220	3	"Phantom For The First Course"	Detroit, Michigan – David Whitney House	August 17, 2016	0.795
The renowned Whitney restaurant in Detroit, which was once owned by a lumber baron in the 1800s, is investigated by the team who suspect deceased family members could be haunting its halls, stirred to life by renovations and construction around the property.
221	4	"Children in the Attic"	Toledo, Ohio – Toledo Yacht Club	August 24, 2016	0.754
TAPS investigate one of the oldest yacht clubs in the U.S., which is also purportedly one of the most haunted. Included: A mother and her son are entangled in phenomena involving a frightening family from the past with a strange story to tell. (with guest investigators TAPS client Susan Hurst and her 11-year-old son, Hunter Spioch who made contact with Jacob, a 10-year-old boy spirit)
222	5	"Paranormal Pirates"	New Bedford, Massachusetts – Fort Taber-Fort Rodman	August 31, 2016	0.776
A new "living history event" is blamed for a spike in frightening paranormal activity at Fort Taber-Fort Rodman in New Bedford, Massachusetts.
223	6	"Fighting Spirit"	East Greenwich, Rhode Island – Varnum Memorial Armory	September 7, 2016	0.610
TAPS is asked to investigate a historic armory that's due to be renovated over fears those involved have of construction possibly provoking lingering spirits attached to artifacts with documented violent pasts.
224	7	"Public Poltergeist Number 1"	Crown Point, Indiana – Old Lake County Jail; Bardstown, Kentucky – My Old Kentucky Home State Park	September 14, 2016	0.752
The Old Lake County Jail in Crown Point, Ind., made famous when "most wanted" gangster John Dillinger escaped in 1934, is investigated by TAPS over reports of aggressive "prisoners" reopening sealed areas and doors. Later, the team travel to the historic My Old Kentucky Home where 16 people died within 24 hours of contracting cholera.
225	8	"Angel of Death"	Valparaiso, Indiana – The Inn at Aberdeen; Brandenburg, Kentucky – Jailhouse Pizza	September 21, 2016	0.584
A beautiful old inn that was once part of the Underground Railroad is investigated by TAPS to determine whether the 150th anniversary to the end of the Civil War could be stirring spirits. Later, a pizzeria is found to have a dark energy of hangings, prisoners and threatening entities, which could make it a risky place to hold a children's birthday party.
226	9	"Overdue For Death"	Westerly, Rhode Island – Westerly Library	September 28, 2016	0.732
A library recently designated as a literary landmark is investigated over reports of ghostly visitors with a thirst for knowledge.
227	10	"Stone Cold Colonists"	Philadelphia, Pennsylvania – Phisick House; Middletown, Connecticut – Middletown Alms House & Jail	October 5, 2016	0.719
The former home of a surgeon is thought to be haunted by the restless spirits of the doctor's subjects of research. Later, TAPS try to bring peace to an 1800s jail as they encounter the ghosts of its long-deceased insane and indigent inhabitants.
228	11	"Haunting of the Garde"	New London, Connecticut – Garde Arts Center	October 12, 2016	0.592
The team investigate a theater built in the 1920s, which is rumored to be haunted by a prominent New London whaling family who lived in a mansion that once stood on the site.
229	12	"Dudley Dead Wright"	Cornwall Bridge, Connecticut – Vogel residence (1780 House); Wrightsville, Pennsylvania – John Wright Restaurant and Wrightsville House	October 19, 2016	0.649
A homeowner worries that evil entities could threaten her family because her property borders what was once a cursed 1740s village. Also: A restaurant and nearby house seem to be linked by spirits.
230	13	"Manor of Mystery"	Wilmington, Delaware – Rockwood Mansion Museum	October 26, 2016	0.833
A museum director and volunteer are worried that an upcoming Victorian exhibit could agitate entities from that time period. Joining the team on their investigation are actors Rachel Nichols and Jonathan Sadowski. (with guest investigators, actors Rachel Nichols and Jonathan Sadowski)

=== Season 12 (2019) ===
No. overall	No. in season	Title	Location(s)	Original release date	U.S. viewers (millions)
231	1	"School Spirit"	Pocatello, Idaho - Pocatello High School	August 21, 2019	0.850
Grant Wilson assembles a new team to investigate paranormal happenings at a high school in Idaho. This is the first episode without Jason Hawes's participation.
232	2	"The Lady in the Window"	Albion, New York - Pillars Estate	August 28, 2019	0.712
Grant and his team investigate the Pillars Estate in Albion, New York, when the owner claims the house seems to not want him to leave.
233	3	"Return to St. Augustine"	St. Augustine, Florida – St. Augustine Light (revisit #2)	September 4, 2019	0.633
The team comes to the aid of a woman who has been tortured for years by unexplained activity in her home. Also, Grant returns to the St. Augustine Lighthouse, site of some of the most compelling paranormal evidence ever captured in 'Ghost Hunters' history.
234	4	"The Cursed Castle"	Loudonville, Ohio – Mohican Castle	September 11, 2019	0.666
The team visits Landoll's Mohican Castle, a European-style castle that serves as a hotel.
235	5	"There's Something in the Seminary"	Madison, Ohio - Madison Seminary	September 18, 2019	0.710
Grant and the team travel to the nearly 200-year-old Madison Seminary to help an enterprising amateur ghost hunter.
236	6	"Dancing with the Dead"	Indianapolis, Indiana - Athanaeum	October 9, 2019	0.580
The Ghost Hunters head to the Athenaeum, a cultural center in the heart of Indianapolis that ultimately turns the investigation upside down.
237	7	"Suicide Hotel"	Okawville, Illinois - Original Springs Hotel	October 16, 2019	0.561
Grant and the team journey to the Original Springs Hotel in Okawville, Illinois, after receiving an urgent call for help from a man named Jeremy, the hotel owner's son.
238	8	"Home for the Haunting"	Willimantic, Connecticut – private residence	October 16, 2019	0.490
Grant and the team come to the aid of a single mother, Susan, and her young son who are afraid that spirits in their turn-of-the-century Victorian house in Willimantic, CT may be a threat to their safety.
239	9	"You've Been Warned"	Vicksburg, Mississippi – Duff Green Mansion	October 23, 2019	0.609
Harry Sharp was once proud owner of “The Duff Green Mansion” in Vicksburg, Mississippi, which he operated as a bed and breakfast. For decades, Harry observed all kinds of strange paranormal activity at the mansion.
240	10	"Blood on the Bayou"	Unknown locale, Louisiana – private residence	October 23, 2019	0.512
The Ghost Hunters head down south to Louisiana to help a woman who is worried that the sugar cane plantation that has been in her family since after the Civil War, may literally be haunted by its troubled past.
241	11	"Hospital Horror"	Pampa, Texas – Worley Hospital	October 30, 2019	0.339
Cousins Luke and Chelsea purchase a hospital that was abandoned for 44 years and want to turn it into a bed and breakfast; their plans come to a screeching halt as strange things begin to happen soon after starting renovations.

=== Season 13 (2020) ===
No. overall	No. in season	Title	Location(s)	Original release date	U.S. viewers (millions)
242	1	"Terror Town, Part 1"	Clifton, Arizona — multiple locations	April 8, 2020	0.427
Since its founding in 1873, the remote mining town of Clifton, AZ has been trapped in a devastating cycle of violence, mayhem, and natural disaster. But despite its many struggles, Clifton remains home to a small population. Along with its brutal past comes a long history of dark paranormal experiences in the town, which has many residents convinced that Clifton may be cursed. Isolated and concerned the town may no longer be safe for their families, the townspeople have turned to the Ghost Hunters to investigate the continuous paranormal activity and the connection, if any, to Clifton's history of death and misery.
243	2	"Terror Town, Part 2"	Clifton, Arizona — multiple locations	April 8, 2020	0.435
On their second night of investigation in the remote mining town of Clifton, Arizona the team revisits several hubs of paranormal activity as they try to get to the bottom of the aggressive phenomena. Grant, Brandon and Brian have a breakthrough in the Boarding House, where they establish direct communication with a troubled soul. Meanwhile, the rest of the team expands the search perimeter.
244	3	"Proof of Afterlife"	Lincoln, New Mexico - Fort Stanton	April 15, 2020	0.510
Isolated deep in the wilderness of Southern New Mexico, Fort Stanton was originally established in the 19th century as a military post, then later it was converted to a tuberculosis hospital to help combat the epidemic that swept the country at the turn of the century. Thousands are believed to have died and been buried on site. Though no longer in use, it has been preserved as a cherished historical landmark. Disturbing reports of paranormal activity date back to the 1940s, but a recent uptick in claims has the Deputy Director of New Mexico historic sites worried about the safety of the two lone staff members that live on site. He has reached out to the Ghost Hunters for help.
245	4	"Nightmare Camp"	Steamboat Springs, Colorado — Perry-Mansfield Performing Arts School & Camp	April 22, 2020	0.458
The Perry-Mansfield Performing Arts Camp, deep in Northern Colorado forestland, has long been plagued by reports of unsettling paranormal encounters. Today, campers and faculty there still experience paranormal activity. In the first professional investigation of the site, Grant sends the team ahead to begin without him. Later, when Grant joins the team, he proposes a creative tactic that triggers some unexpected results.
246	5	"Alone in Alaska"	Haines, Alaska — Hotel Halsingland	April 29, 2020	0.414
Between 1896 and 1899, countless fortune seekers set out on a voyage to the Klondike region of North America in search of gold. Many had to pass through the small and secluded town of Haines, Alaska. For some, however, Haines was the end of the journey as many lost their lives due to extreme weather conditions, starvation, or bloody conflicts. Due to the violence and disorder, the government established a military outpost to keep the peace. Today, the outpost remains and has since been converted, in part, into a hotel called Hotel Halsingland, where concerning paranormal activity is now being reported. After being contacted by Skylar, a current employee at the hotel, the team agree to trek to Haines where no paranormal investigator has ever investigated.
247	6	"Haunted Hospital"	Galena, Illinois - Galena Marine Hospital	May 6, 2020	0.395
Deep in the woods of Galena, Illinois, a hospital is frozen in time. Built in 1857, the Galena Marine Hospital has seen countless deaths. Since its recent purchase, distressing paranormal activity has been reported; and the current owner, Frank, calls upon the Ghost Hunters for help. The team travels to meet with him and several witnesses; and they hear claims of heavy footsteps, six-foot shadow figures, and light anomalies.
248	7	"The Last Mission"	Wendover, Utah — Wendover Air Force Base	May 13, 2020	0.484
The Wendover Airfield, a onetime Army Air Force Base in the salt flats of the Utah desert, played a crucial role in WWII. During training, dozens of pilots died on the base. Now, recent reports of paranormal activity there have stirred speculation; and the reported hauntings cause the staff to fear for their safety, and for that of the ordinary citizens who travel in and out of the base.
249	8	"The Glenn Family Curse"	Cape Girardeau, Missouri — Glenn House	May 20, 2020	0.539
More than a century ago, when the Glenn House was built in the small town of Cape Girardeau, Missouri, it housed the family of David Glenn, a successful local businessman – until they lost three of their infant children and later went bankrupt. Today, generations later, the historic residence still stands. A rise in disturbing paranormal activity, however, has prompted the local historical association's president to reach out to Grant for help.
250	9	"Return to Waverly Hills"	Louisville, Kentucky – Waverly Hills Sanatorium (revisit #3)	May 27, 2020	0.541
Dubbed one of the "most haunted places on earth," Waverly Hills Sanatorium has long been hailed as a "mecca" for paranormal investigators from all around the globe. It is also the site of some of the most striking paranormal encounters from the original "Ghost Hunters." Now, the new owners have been receiving reports of unsettling new paranormal claims from visitors, which include blood-curdling screams and unexplained sounds. Seeing this as the perfect opportunity to take his new team to one of his favorite haunts, Grant eagerly answers the call for help. (guest investigator: Reanna Wilson) Jason Hawes and TAPS are mentioned.

=== Season 14 (2021–22) ===
No. overall	No. in season	Title	Location(s)	Original release date
251	1	"Bloodiest 47 Acres Redux"	Jefferson City, Missouri – Missouri State Penitentiary (revisit)	October 31, 2021
TAPS investigates reports of doppelgangers at Missouri State Penitentiary. (guest investigators: Adam Berry, Amy Bruni, Dustin Pari)
252	2	"The Lost Souls of Joliet"	Joliet, Illinois – Joliet Correctional Center	January 1, 2022
Dakota Laden, Tanner Wiseman and Alex Schroeder of Destination Fear join TAPS as they take on Old Joliet Prison. Unsettling paranormal activity has been ramping up at the now-shuttered penitentiary, and volunteers there are desperate for answers.
253	3	"Lost Bones of the Argo"	Crofton, Nebraska – Argo Hotel	January 8, 2022
Satori Hawes and Cody DesBiens join TAPS for an investigation at a Nebraska hotel with a grim and grisly past. With frightening phenomena taking ahold of the property, the owners need TAPS' help to determine how safe it is for guests.
254	4	"The Haunted Brewery"	Pittsburgh, Pennsylvania – The Church Brew Works	January 15, 2022
TAPS investigates a church-turned-brewery in Pittsburgh where ominous apparitions roam the floor and ghostly footsteps echo above. The team looks to an accidental death that took place on the property to help solve the mystery behind the haunting.
255	5	"The Castle Light Mystery"	Surry County, Virginia – Bacon's Castle	January 22, 2022
TAPS heads to Virginia to explore Bacon's Castle, where for centuries people have witnessed an eerie ball of light traveling around the property. UFO expert Ben Hansen joins the investigation to determine if this ghostly orb is extraterrestrial in origin.
256	6	"Ghosts of Gaines Tavern"	Walton, Kentucky – Abner Gaines House	January 29, 2022
TAPS visits a 19th-century Kentucky tavern plagued by a series of murders and suicides. The city is getting ready to reopen the building to the public, and the mayor wants to be sure that remnants of its tragic past do not resurface as dangerous entities.
257	7	"A Boy and Buried Secrets"	Stephens City, Virginia – Valerie Hill Winery	February 5, 2022
A Virginia winery is ripe with unexplained occurrences. Frightened by the daily disruptions and run-ins with apparitions, the owners bring in TAPS to investigate the strange phenomena to find out if it threatens the safety of family, employees and guests.
258	8	"The Haunted House on the Hill"	Jonesborough, Tennessee – Talcott Residence	February 12, 2022
Rock legend Meat Loaf joins TAPS to investigate an old farmhouse in Tennessee. Rumors of terrifying activity have plagued the property for decades, but the new owners want to reassure the community that their home does not harbor dangerous entities.
259	9	"The Girl With No Eyes"	Holton, Kansas – Zibell Farmhouse	February 19, 2022
TAPS calls in Dustin Pari to join them in a baffling case in rural Kansas. Residents of an old farmhouse have reported unnerving paranormal activity over the past decade, and the new owners desperately need answers as to who or what is haunting the home.
260	10	"Wraiths of Winchester"	Winchester, Virginia – Philip Williams House	February 26, 2022
TAPS investigates the Philip Williams House, a historic Virginia home bloodied by the Civil War and haunted by unexplained apparitions and violence. Secrets concealed beneath its floors may be tied to the extensive paranormal phenomena.
261	11	"Moonshiner Spirits"	Fieldsboro, New Jersey – White Hill Mansion	March 5, 2022
TAPS visits a New Jersey mansion where the mysterious death of its original owner hangs over the property. Renovations seem to be stirring up ghostly activity, and volunteers want to be sure that the deadly past isn't coming back to haunt the present.
262	12	"The Shadow Man"	Toledo, Ohio – Collingwood Arts Center	March 12, 2022
TAPS and Kris Williams head to Ohio to investigate a performing arts center haunted by shadow figures, unexplained noises and a ghostly nun. The staff wants to make sure that the escalating paranormal phenomena won't harm the artists in residence.
263	13	"Tortured Souls of Cresson"	Cresson, Pennsylvania – Cresson Sanatorium	March 19, 2022
The Ghost Brothers and Dustin Pari join TAPS to investigate an abandoned sanatorium in rural Pennsylvania. Once notorious for its horrific treatment of the mentally ill and inmates, the historic property is now plagued by unnerving activity.

=== Season 15 (2022) ===
====== *Episode 266 Overall (#3 in season) is incorrectly listed as a location in Wisconsin (Summerwind Mansion) - Actual location: Rolling Fork, MS (Mont Helena) ======
No. overall	No. in season	Title	Location(s)	Original release date	U.S. viewers (millions)
264	1	"Keeper of the Light"	Pensacola Bay, Florida – Pensacola Light (revisit)	October 1, 2022	0.385
TAPS reunites with Amy Bruni, Adam Berry and Kris Williams in Florida, where a new exhibition is stirring up paranormal activity at the Pensacola Lighthouse. The worried staff wants to make sure that visitors will not be harmed by the unsettled spirits. Grant Wilson is mentioned.
265	2	"Bound by Blood"	Luzerne County, Pennsylvania – Luzerne County Library System	October 8, 2022	0.372
TAPS checks out the frightening paranormal events inundating Pennsylvania's Osterhout Free Library. With the help of Olympic figure skater Johnny Weir, the team dives deep into this former church that stands on land bloodied by Revolutionary War violence.
266	3	"On Hallowed Mound"	Land o' Lakes, Wisconsin - Summerwind Mansion	October 15, 2022	0.319
Satori Hawes and Cody DesBiens join TAPS as they take on a haunted home sitting high atop a former sacred Native American mound. Acclaimed pastry chef and Food Network judge Stephanie Boswell also comes along for the investigation as the team faces sins of the past.
267	4	"Phantom Island"	Blennerhassett Island, West Virginia	October 22, 2022	0.311
The Ghost Brothers join TAPS for an investigation on a mysterious West Virginia island that was at the center of a treasonous plot.
268	5	"Cursed Coliseum"	Biloxi, Mississippi	October 29, 2022	0.315
TAPS visits the Gulf Coast to investigate a hotbed of unexplained activity at the Mississippi Coast Coliseum. Alongside guest investigator Steve Shippy, the team takes over the cavernous structure to help explain the frightening events shaking employees.
269	6	"Ship of Lost Souls"	Camden, New Jersey - USS New Jersey	November 5, 2022	0.277
TAPS climbs aboard the Battleship New Jersey to confront ghostly sailors still manning their posts. Dustin Pari and Kris Williams reunite with the team to help identify the root of the unnerving activity to ensure everyone's safety on board the ship.
270	7	"Poltergeist Prison"	Mount Pleasant, North Carolina - Whiskey Prison	November 12, 2022	0.302
TAPS is called to North Carolina to investigate prison-turned-whiskey distillery. A flurry of unexplained activity, including physical attacks from an unseen force, has left employees on edge. The team taps into the facility's tragic past to find answers.
271	8	"The Sayre Specters"	Bethlehem, Pennsylvania - Sayre Mansion	November 19, 2022	N/A
TAPS and guest investigators Samantha Hawes and Dustin Pari are called to a Pennsylvania mansion after staff and guests notice an alarming increase in paranormal activity. The team's investigation unearths a grave secret about this house of tragedies.

=== Season 16 (2023) ===
No. overall	No. in season	Title	Location(s)	Original release date	U.S. viewers (millions)
272	1	"Dead Man Walking"	Hanford, California – Wild West jail	April 6, 2023	N/A
In downtown Hanford, California, sits an imposing, abandoned county jail more than 125 years old. The Bastille, as it is known today, has captured the imagination of the residents who, for decades, have reported encountering apparitions and other strange activity in this building. In the years since this former Wild West jail was shuttered, many businesses have come and gone inside the old building, but they all share one commonality – claims of chilling paranormal phenomena. Now, many believe that the decades of suffering and deaths that occurred inside the jail are behind the ongoing hauntings. Joining TAPS on this investigation is actor Chandler Riggs (The Walking Dead), as well as investigators Satori Hawes and Cody DesBiens.
273	2	"Trapped in Terror"	Gold Country, California – Argonaut Mine and Kennedy Mine	April 13, 2023	N/A
TAPS is called to California's Gold Country to investigate the Argonaut and Kennedy mines. On the heels of the 100th anniversary of the state's largest mining tragedy, the team, joined by paranormal explorer Dakota Laden and the Destination Fear crew, faces frightening phenomena that remains on these properties from decades gone by.
274	3	"The Hoover Damned"	Clark County, Nevada – Hoover Dam	April 20, 2023	N/A
The TAPS team dive into uncharted waters at the Hoover Dam to investigate the iconic superstructure. Dustin Pari and Kris Williams join in as they seek out the lost souls and terrifying shadow figures that haunt this massive landmark.
275	4	"The Mansion of Misfortune"	Bessemer, Alabama – The Moody Mansion	April 27, 2023	N/A
TAPS investigates an Alabama mansion that was once home to high society gatherings as well as misery and misfortune. Satori Hawes and Cody DesBiens help dig up secrets from beyond the grave to bring peace to spirits of days long past.
276	5	"Unholy Matrimony"	Allentown, Pennsylvania – George Taylor House	May 4, 2023	N/A
TAPS and guest investigator Dustin Pari investigate the home of an American Founding Father, and where a betrothed couple intends to have their wedding. A dark, aggressive energy has overtaken the house, leading to fears that the haunting will upend the impending nuptials.
277	6	"The Myth of St. Ignatius"	Colfax, Washington – St. Ignatius Hospital	May 11, 2023	N/A
TAPS and special guest Tory Belleci descend on the small town of Colfax, Washington, where chilling spirits haunt the hallways of the now abandoned St. Ignatius Hospital. The century-old building harbors the dark energy of illness, death and a tragic scandal, putting plans to turn it into a hotel at risk.
278	7	"Generations of Ghosts"	Gallatin, Tennessee – Rose Mont	May 18, 2023	N/A
TAPS answers a desperate call for help at historic Rose Mont, a former cattle and thoroughbred farm and plantation in Gallatin, Tennessee. Reports of hauntings at this grand mansion go back for decades, but a recent spike in harrowing paranormal phenomena has put the staff on edge.
279	8	"Diocese of the Dead"	Ogdensburg, New York – The Claire House	May 25, 2023	N/A
TAPS is called to Ogdensburg, New York, to investigate a large family home. Once a church rectory, this imposing limestone manor is filled with terrifying entities that tie back to its religious beginnings. Alongside Jason's son, Austin Hawes, and guest investigator Dustin Pari, TAPS hopes to calm the family's fear of being in their house.

== Specials ==
Episodes marked "special" in the above tables are listed on SyFy.com as regular season episodes, although they do not appear to be counted as regular televised investigations because episode #601 "Alcatraz" was promoted as the "100th episode", (if the specials were counted there would be more than that). The specials are just reviews and recaps of investigations. The following list are televised Ghost Hunters events that are not counted as part of any particular season of the program.

No.	Title	Location(s)	Original release date	U.S. viewers (millions)
1	"2005 Halloween Special"	Savannah, Georgia Moon River Brewery; Sorrel-Weed House	October 31, 2005	N/A
TAPS goes to Savannah, Georgia, to investigate the Moon River Brewery and The Sorrel Weed House, a historic museum that conducts Savannah tours. (Unlike later Halloween specials, this one was not presented live.)
2	"Best of Seasons 1 and 2"	—	May 24, 2006	N/A
Jason and Grant count down the 20 most memorable moments of Ghost Hunters.
3	"2006 Halloween Special – Ghost Hunters Live"	Estes Park, Colorado – The Stanley Hotel (revisit)	October 31, 2006; 11PM ET	1.400
It was a six-hour broadcast originating from The Stanley Hotel in Estes Park, Colorado. ECW wrestler CM Punk joined TAPS throughout the investigation. The viewing audience was able to interact with the team via SMS text messages.
4	"2007 Halloween Special – Ghost Hunters Live"	Louisville, Kentucky – Waverly Hills Sanatorium (revisit #1)	October 31, 2007; 9PM ET	2.800
It was a six-hour broadcast originating from the Waverly Hills Sanatorium near Louisville, Kentucky. Joining the team was guest ECW wrestler Elijah Burke. The episode was hosted by paranormal investigator Josh Gates from the show Destination Truth who was stationed in an on-site "interactive center" which posted real time photos to SciFi.com. Also employed was a "Panic Button" message feature where viewers could alert the investigators of any strange happenings as they occurred. Simultaneously, SciFi.com ran an online poll, "The Hunt for the Hunter", Where viewers picked the new TAPS member who chosen among three finalists, Patrick Clark, Mark Fusetti, and Deanna Hoffman. Mark Fusetti was picked as the new TAPS member during the review of the Halloween Special on November 5.
5	"Revelations"	—	November 14, 2007	N/A
Special TAPS Q&A Session with host Josh Gates.
6	"Return to St. Augustine Light"	St. Augustine, Florida – St. Augustine Lighthouse (revisit #1)	January 9, 2008	N/A
TAPS returns to the St. Augustine Lighthouse in Florida. Steve battles his fear of heights in hopes he can have the experience he missed out on during the last investigation. (Aired before the premiere episode of Ghost Hunters International.)
7	"2008 Halloween Special – Ghost Hunters Live"	New Castle County, Delaware – Fort Delaware (revisit)	October 31, 2008	2.600
TAPS conducted a seven-hour, live, return investigation to Fort Delaware with guest host Josh Gates of Destination Truth. Guest investigators were actor Steve Valentine the host of Sci-Fi's Estate of Panic game show, actress Amanda Tapping from the Sci-Fi series Sanctuary and Stargate SG-1, ECW wrestler The Miz and Ghost Hunters International members Dustin Pari and Robb Demarest. It also featured the finalists for the "Great American Ghost Hunt": Lauren Telarole (Spirits of Beardslee Castle), Danielle Parody (Private Island Haunting), and Erick and Tammila Wright (Disembodied Voices from Rocky Mountains Past). Danielle Parody's case was chosen to be investigated first during the follow-up review episode on November 5.
8	"2009 Halloween Special – Ghost Hunters Live"	Cedar Grove, New Jersey – Essex County Sanitarium (revisit)	October 31, 2009	1.800 (TV) 12.100 (online)
TAPS conducted a return live investigation of the Essex County Sanitarium in Cedar Grove, New Jersey, with the student crew from the Ghost Hunters Academy spin-off series. Guest Josh Gates of Destination Truth hosted the event. During the program, clips from past Ghost Hunters investigations, considered the most memorable, were shown. The special also employed an interactive "Panic Button" feature where viewers could contribute feedback during the event through online and cellphone texting.
9	"2010 Halloween Special – Ghost Hunters Live"	Buffalo, New York – Buffalo Central Terminal (revisit)	October 31, 2010	3.200 (online)
TAPS conducted a return live, six-hour investigation of the Buffalo Central Terminal in Buffalo, New York. The event was hosted by Josh Gates of Destination Truth with co-host Allison Scagliotti of Warehouse 13, with guests Ben Hansen from Fact or Faked: Paranormal Files, Joe Maddalena of Hollywood Treasure, Meaghan Rath of Being Human, Kofi Kingston of WWE, as well as Barry Fitzgerald of Ghost Hunters International and new TAPS member Adam Berry, graduate of Ghost Hunters Academy.
10	"2011 Halloween Special – Ghost Hunters Live"	Spring City, Pennsylvania – Pennhurst Asylum (revisit)	October 31, 2011	1.400 (TV) 3.900 (online)
The TAPS team revisits Pennhurst Asylum in Spring City, Pennsylvania, for a live six-hour investigation. The program used live interactive features so the viewing audience could help during the investigation. The event was hosted by Josh Gates of Destination Truth along with guest investigators Jael de Pardo, Ben Hansen, and Devin Marble from Fact or Faked: Paranormal Files. Also appearing were Barry Fitzgerald, Kris Williams, and Joe Chin of Ghost Hunters International as well as Jason Hawes's daughter Hailey Hawes and TAPS ghost-hunting dog, Maddie.
11	"Back on the Hunt"	—	August 21, 2019	0.690
The countdown begins. In the hour before the much-anticipated launch of the all-new Ghost Hunters, the cast gathers to answer an avalanche of fan questions. (Aired prior to the premiere of season 12.)
12	"Beyond the Investigation"	—	September 11, 2019	0.458
Ever wonder what you didn’t see in those famous Ghost Hunters investigations? In this one-hour special, Team Leader Grant Wilson gives viewers an exclusive inside look at how the squad goes above and beyond to search for paranormal activity while deliberately debunking claims with a logical explanation. This is a must-see for anyone interested in the bigger picture of each paranormal investigation, from claim to conclusion. (Aired prior to the fourth episode of the twelfth season; "The Cursed Castle.")

== See also ==
- Ghost Hunters home media releases
