= Meade County Jail =

- U.S. National Register of Historic Places
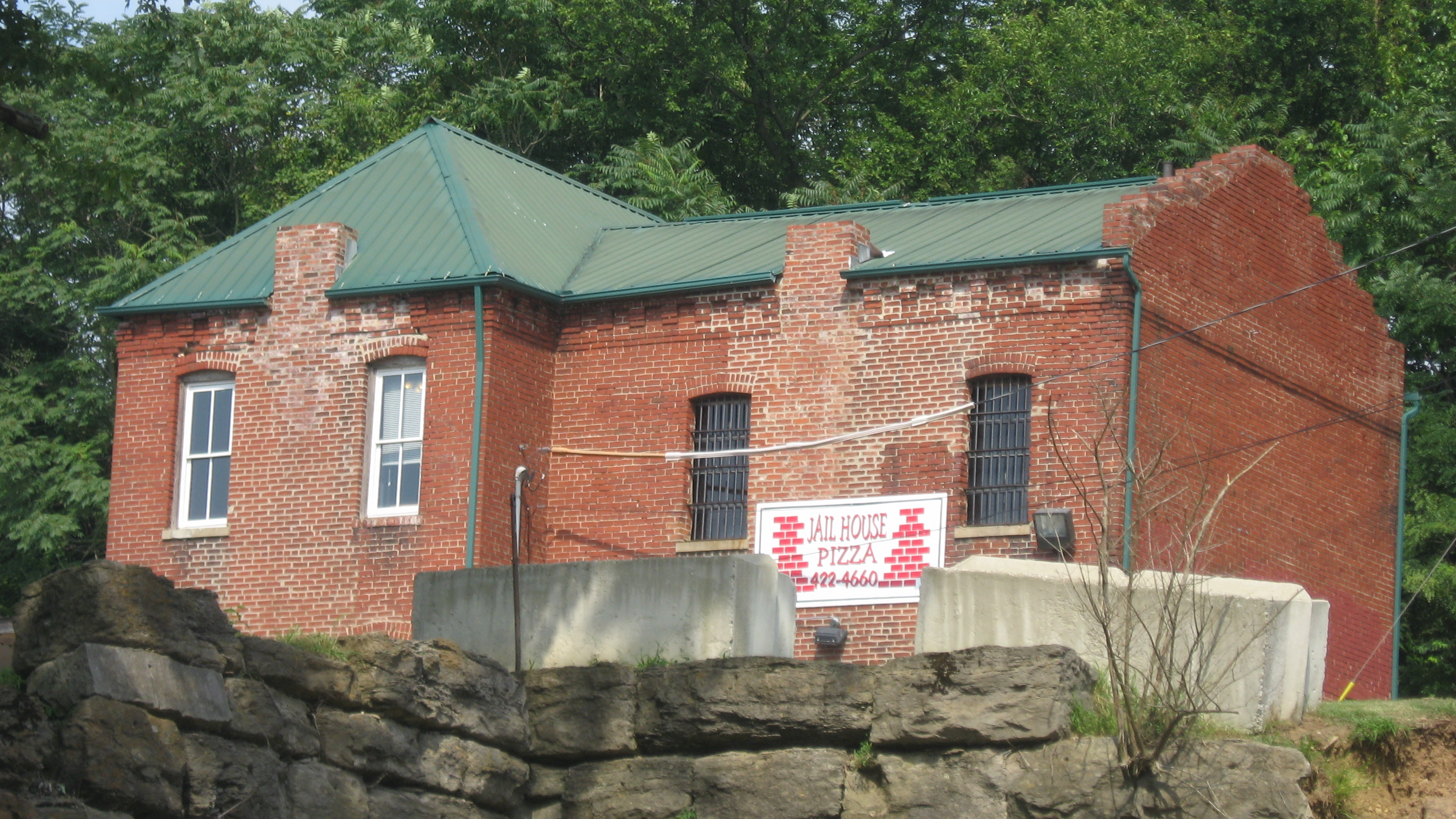

- Location within Kentucky Location within the United States
- Location: 125 Main St., Brandenburg, Kentucky
- Coordinates: 38°00′16″N 86°10′05″W
- Area: 0.5 acres (0.20 ha)
- Built: 1906
- Built by: Panly Jail Co.
- MPS: Brandenburg MRA
- NRHP reference No.: 84001837
- Added to NRHP: August 14, 1984

The Meade County Jail, in Brandenburg, Kentucky, was built in 1906. It was listed on the National Register of Historic Places in 1984.

It is a two-story common bond brick building with a two-story brick ell. It overlooks the Ohio River.

It was the third jail of Meade County. The first was a log building built in 1826. The second was an 1854 brick building. Bricks from the second jail building were used in the construction of this 1906 building.

Now known as Jailhouse Pizza, the building was featured in an episode of Ghost Hunters in 2016 and an episode of The Paranormal Journey in 2017.
