= Houghton Mansion =

Historic house in Massachusetts, United States

- U.S. Historic district – Contributing property
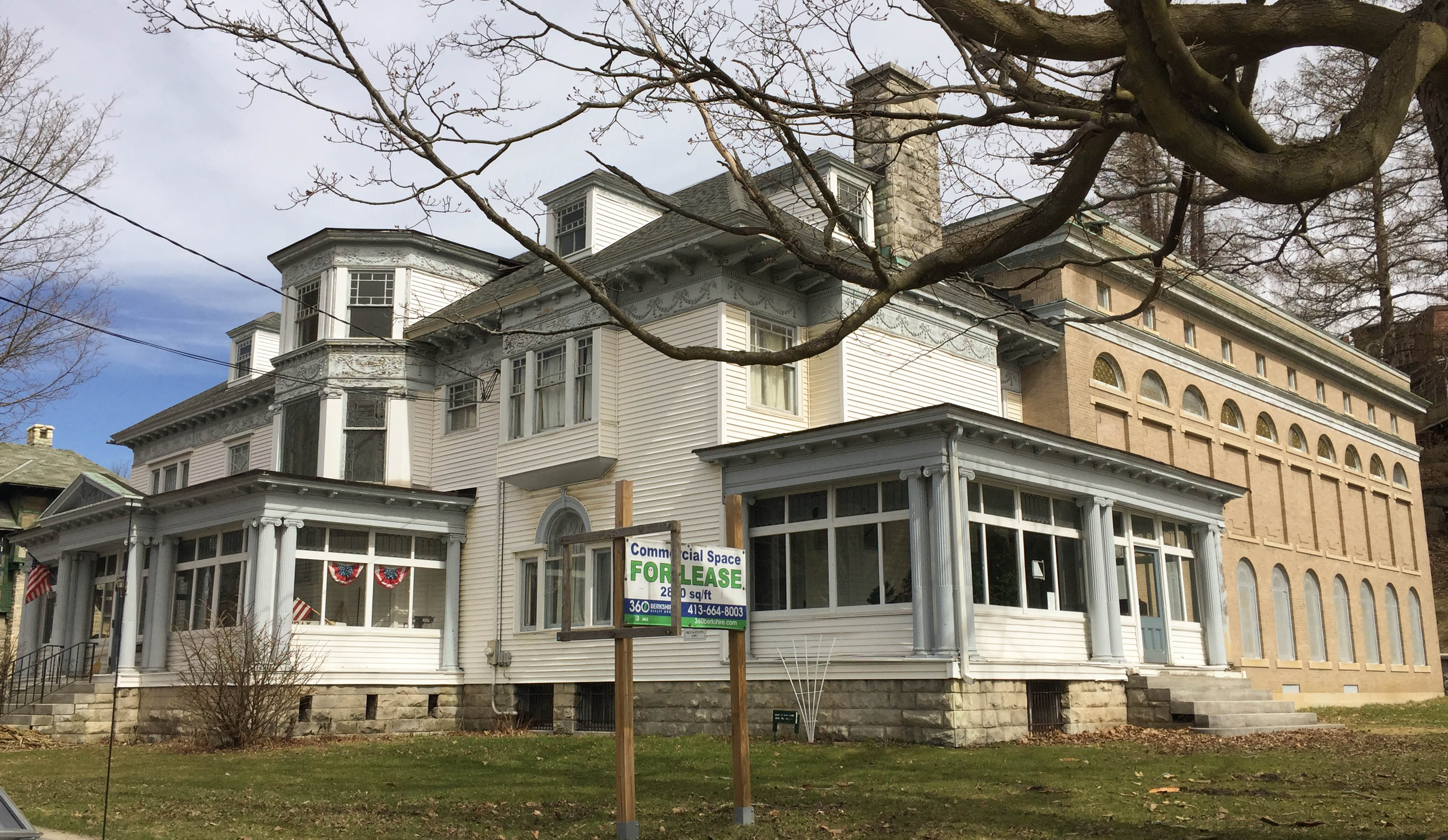
- Houghton Mansion

- Location within Massachusetts Location within the United States
- Location: 172 Church Street, North Adams, Massachusetts
- Coordinates: 42°41′46″N 73°6′22″W
- Part of: Church Street-Caddy Hill Historic District (ID83000567, 85003376)
- MPS: North Adams MRA (AD)
- Added to NRHP: October 25, 1985

The Houghton Mansion is the former home of Albert Charles Houghton and his family in North Adams, Massachusetts. It was later used as a Masonic temple, but is now empty.

== History ==
Albert Charles Houghton, President of the Arnold Print Works and first Mayor of North Adams, Massachusetts, built what is now the Masonic Temple in the 1890s, shortly before his term as Mayor expired. It was his third home in North Adams, and the most extravagant, reflecting his wealth and status. Built in a Neoclassical Revival style, it has strong Greek features along with an eclectic array of influences from many diverse sources. The mansion's roof was made with Spanish tile, and the clapboards were thinner near the bottom to make the house appear taller than it actually was. There was a formal garden in the rear, which was often used for parties to raise money for the North Adams Hospital. The Houghtons moved in circa 1900, the family then consisting of Mr. Houghton, his wife Cordelia, and their youngest surviving daughter Mary, then 23 years old. Another daughter, Laura died as an infant, while three others lived to grow up, marry, and produce their own children. In 1905, when Mr. Houghton was 61 years old, his health started to fail. At that point, Mary resolved that she would never wed, but devoted her life to taking care of her father. A manic workaholic with a passion for business, Mr. Houghton did not in fact retire, but only cut back, dividing his time between the APW sales officers in New York City and North Adams, leaving the major decisions to be decided by his son-in-law, William A. Gallup.

== 1914 car crash ==
In spring 1914, the Houghtons invested in their first car, a seven-passenger Pierce-Arrow touring car, and sent their long-time chauffeur, John Widders also known as John Winters, to learn to drive it. On August 1 of the year, Mr. Houghton, and his daughter, Mary decided to go to Bennington, Vermont for a pleasure drive. Mrs. Houghton decided to stay home. They were accompanied by Dr. and Mrs. Robert Hutton of New York. Mrs. Hutton (née. Sybil Cady) was a childhood friend of Mary's and a daughter of the North Adams shoe manufacturer WG Cady. With Widders at the wheel, the car left the Houghton mansion at 9:00 am; at 9:30 it was in Pownal, Vermont heading up what is now Oak Hill Rd. The road was under repair, and a team of horses was parked on the right hand side. Widders went around them on the left, at about 12 mph. On the left shoulder, the car tilted and went down a steep embankment, rolling over three times before coming to rest in an upright position in a farmer's field. Everyone except Mary Houghton was thrown out of the car. The men all escaped with minor injuries such as cuts, scrapes, bruises and minor fractures. The women weren't so lucky. Mrs. Hutton was killed almost instantly when the car rolled over her. Mary Houghton was hurt just as badly and died of her injuries at 3:00 pm at the North Adams Hospital. Expecting to survive, Mr. Houghton was taken home, he died ten days later on August 11, 1914. It was said he died of a broken heart. The investigator for the State of Vermont exonerated Widders of all wrongdoing, blaming the accident instead on the soft shoulder of the road. But Widders still blamed himself and, at 5:00 am on August 12, 1914, he shot himself in the cellar of the Houghton Barn with a horse pistol.

== The Masons ==
Following the crash, one of two surviving Houghton daughters, Florence, moved into the house with her husband, William A. Gallup, and made the mansion their home, looking after Mrs. Houghton until her death in 1916. They resided in the house until Mr. Gallup retired in 1926. Florence Gallup and her sister, Susan Houghton McKeon, sold it to the Masons in 1926. The Masons did away with the formal garden and constructed their lodge building in its place. In more recent years, for the sake of economy, the Spanish tile roof was removed and replaced with asphalt, and siding has been put on over the clapboards. Otherwise, the exterior looks just as it did when it was built.

== Current status ==
Unable to afford keeping the building up to code, the Lafayette-Greylock Freemasons in 2017 sold the house to hotel developer Benjamin Svenon at a reported price of $160,000. The building has since been closed to the public.
