= Pensacola Light =

Lighthouse in Florida, US

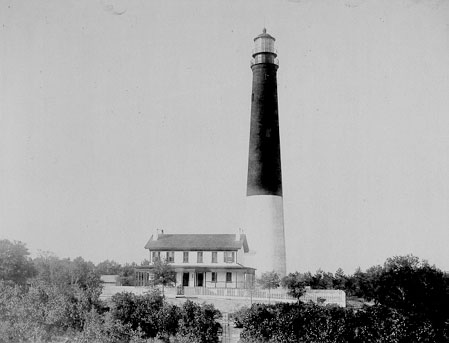
- The second Pensacola Lighthouse, date unknown
- Location: Entrance to Pensacola Bay
- Coordinates: 30°20′47″N 87°18′29″W

Tower
- Constructed: 1858
- Construction: granite (foundation), brick (tower)
- Automated: 1965
- Height: 150 ft (46 m)
- Shape: conical
- Heritage: National Register of Historic Places listed place

Light
- Focal height: 190 ft (58 m)
- Lens: first order Fresnel lens
- Range: 27 nmi (50 km; 31 mi)
- Characteristic: Fl W 20s
- First tower
- Constructed: 1824
- Height: 40 ft (12 m)
- Lens: Argand lamp with parabolic reflectors
- Pensacola lightship Aurora Borealis
- First lit: 1823
- Pensacola Bar Beacon
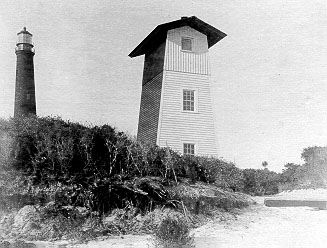
- The Pensacola Bar Beacon, with the Pensacola Lighthouse in the background
- Constructed: 1879
- Construction: structural wood
- Height: 26 ft (7.9 m)
- Shape: square pyramid
- Deactivated: 1900s
- Focal height: 55 ft (17 m)
- Lens: sixth order Fresnel lens
- Range: 11 nmi (20 km; 13 mi)
- Characteristic: F W
- Pensacola Lighthouse and Keeper's Quarters
- U.S. National Register of Historic Places
- Area: less than one acre
- Built: 1859
- NRHP reference No.: 74000622
- Added to NRHP: July 15, 1974

The Pensacola Light is a lighthouse at Pensacola Bay, in Florida. It is the third iteration of what was originally a lightship, the Aurora Borealis, and remains an aid to navigation.

== History ==
The first Pensacola Light was the lightship Aurora Borealis. It was moved to Pensacola in 1823 from its previous post at the mouth of the Mississippi River after a lighthouse had been completed there. Because of frequent rough seas, the lightship had to be anchored inside the bay entrance, behind Santa Rosa Island, and could not reliably be seen from ships outside the bay.

=== Tower ===
In 1825 a 40-foot (12 m) tower was built on a 40-foot (12 m) bluff at the south entrance to Pensacola Bay. This light was also partially obscured by trees close to the tower and on Santa Rosa Island. In 1858 a new tower was built on the north side of the bay entrance, and was lit on January 1, 1859. The new, and current, tower is 150 feet (46 m) tall, and also sits on a 40-foot (12 m) bluff located on the Pensacola Naval Air Station, placing the light 190 feet (58 m) above sea level.

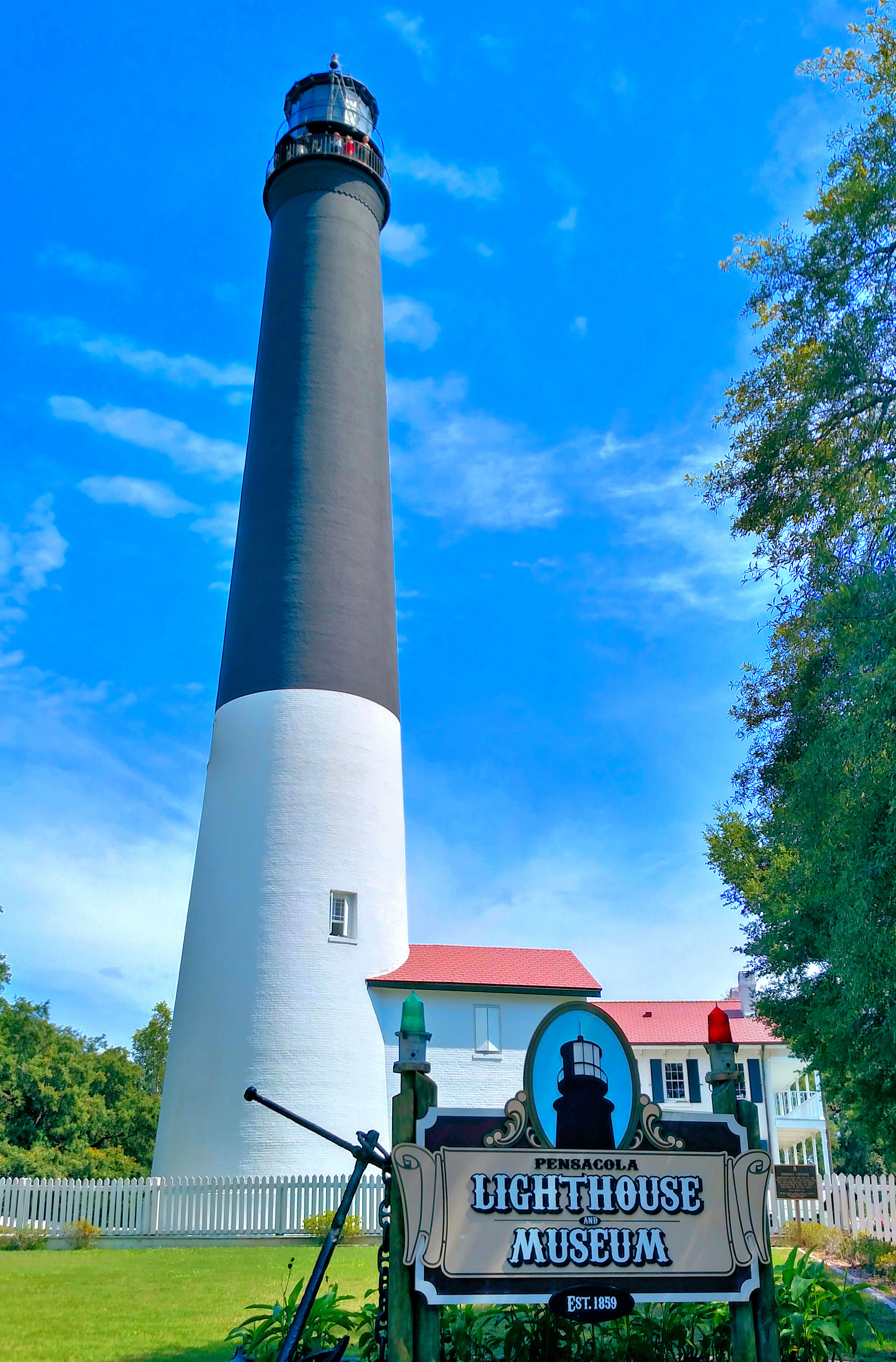
The current Pensacola Lighthouse

The new location allowed the tower to serve as the rear range light marking the passage across the Pensacola Bar. Little is known of the first front range light. In 1879 a new front range beacon was erected 448 feet (137 m) southeast of the light tower. This light, known as the Pensacola Bar Beacon, was a square pyramidal wooden tower, 26 feet (7.9 m) tall, sitting on a point 29 feet (8.8 m) above sea level, so that the light was 55 feet (17 m) above the water. It had a sixth order Fresnel lens, and showed a fixed white light visible for 11 miles (18 km). The Pensacola Bar Beacon was removed from service and demolished some time in the early 1900s.

At the start of the Civil War, Pensacola was controlled by Confederate forces, while Fort Pickens across the bay remained in Union hands. Confederate authorities removed the lens from the lighthouse, and most of the lighthouse supplies were requisitioned for the war effort. In November 1861 an artillery duel between the two forces damaged the lighthouse tower.

Confederate forces later evacuated Pensacola, and were replaced by Union forces. In 1863 the Pensacola Light was relit using a fourth-order Fresnel lens. A new first-order lens was placed in the tower in 1869. The tower was all white during the Civil War. Later, the upper two-thirds of the tower was painted black. Electricity was introduced to the lighthouse in 1939, eliminating the need to rewind the light rotation clockworks every 4½ hours. The light was automated in 1965. The lighthouse tower and associated buildings were placed on the National Register of Historic Places in 1974.

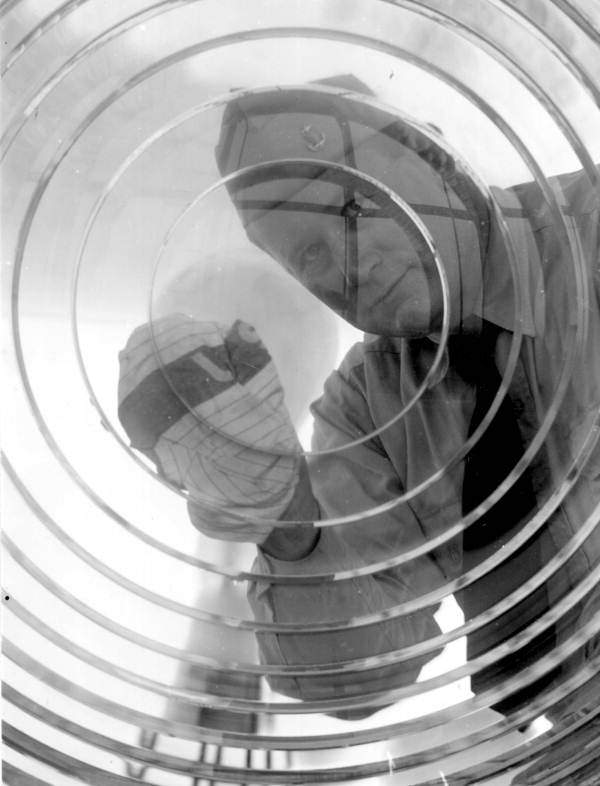
Lighthouse keeper cleaning the lens of the Lighthouse, circa 1960.

In 1989, the lighthouse and keeper's quarters were listed in A Guide to Florida's Historic Architecture, published by the University of Florida Press.

== Present day ==
The Pensacola Light remains an active aid to navigation. The Coast Guard Auxiliary Flotilla 17 had provided tours of the lighthouse, but they were discontinued in 2007. As of 2009, the lighthouse reopened on a limited basis for public tours, and since early 2011 it has been open 7 days a week. Maintenance and tour operations are currently conducted by the Pensacola Lighthouse Association. The 1869 keeper's quarters, adjacent to the lighthouse tower, houses a museum and gift shop also administered by the Pensacola Lighthouse Association. The Association is a 501 (c) 3 non-profit, with a small staff and a large volunteer base.
