= Alexandria Zoological Park =

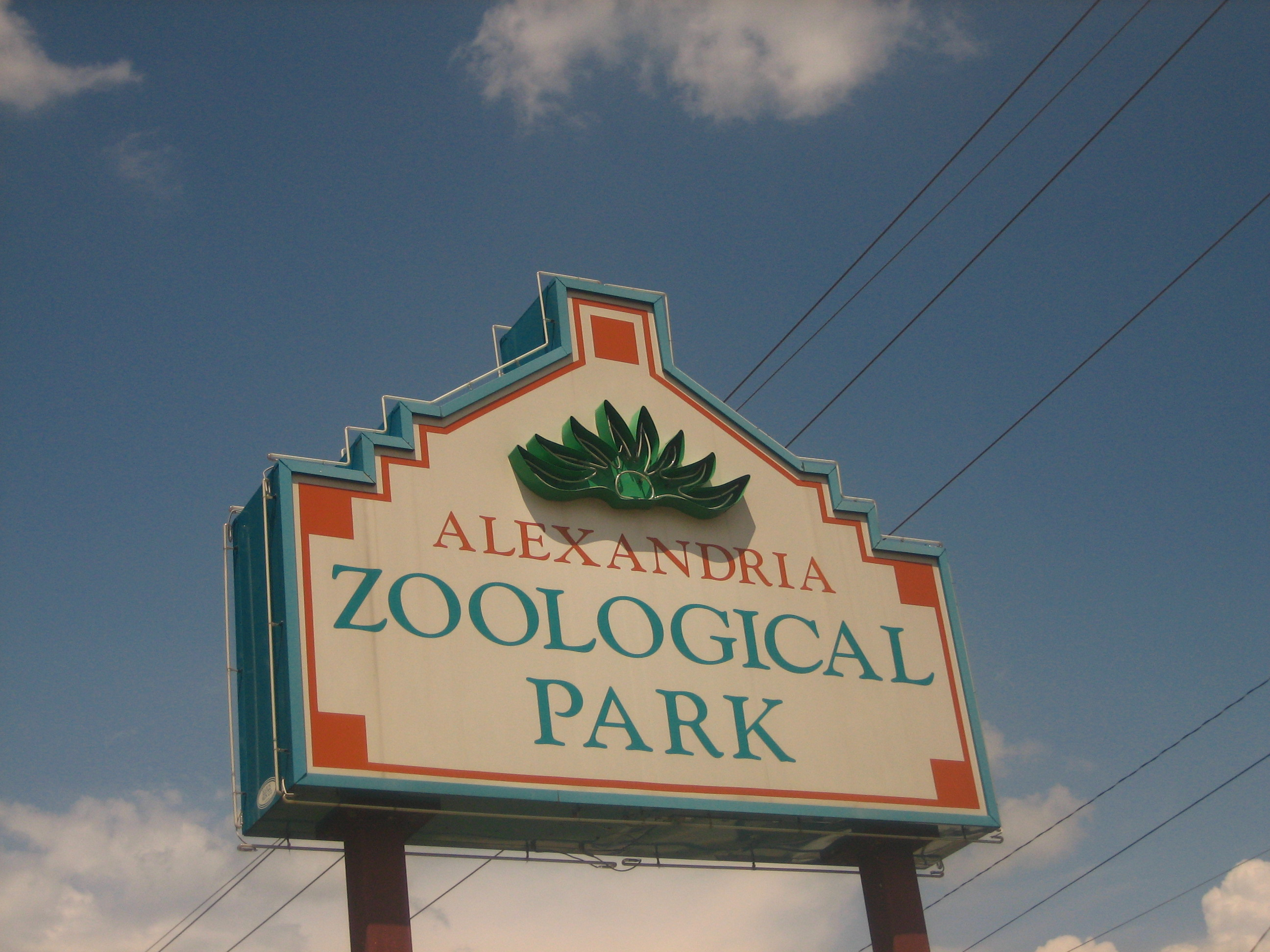
- Entrance sign to the zoo
- Interactive map of Alexandria Zoological Park
- 31.287642°N 92.457365°W
- Date opened: 1926 (100 years ago)
- Location: Alexandria, Louisiana
- Land area: 33 acres (13 ha)
- No. of animals: 500
- Website: www.thealexandriazoo.com

The Alexandria Zoological Park is a 33-acre (13 ha) zoo located in Alexandria, Louisiana, United States. First opened to the public in 1922, it is owned by the City of Alexandria and operated by the Division of Public Works. It is home to about 500 animals.

The zoo was started in 1922 in Bringhurst Park as a row of cages. When the United States Department of Agriculture (USDA) threatened to close the zoo in the 1960s, the city created the committee that is now Friends of the Alexandria Zoo (FOTAZ), the support organization for the zoo.

== History ==
The Alexandria Zoological Park was established in 1922 in Bringhurst Park. Photos from the early 1930s show cages constructed of chain link fence and iron bars, with very little vegetation planted near the exhibits. The only exhibits to survive from this era are the original fish pools, which are now used for wild fowl habitat. Additional cages, including a sea lion pool, were added in the 1940s.

Although public comment indicates that the zoo once housed a chimpanzee and buffalo, the zoo was mostly started with discarded pets such as rabbits, goats, and deer. There is very little documentation for these early years, but the zoo seems to have changed very little until the late 1960s or early 1970s when the United States Department of Agriculture threatened to close it. This prompted City Commissioner O'Hearn Mathews to appoint the first zoo committee, which evolved into the Friends of the Alexandria Zoo (FOTAZ), the current support organization for the zoo.

Much of the credit for the current quality of the zoo has been given to Robert Leslie Whitt (1951–2008), who served as director for 34 years prior to his death. Whitt was hired in 1974 by then Streets and Parks Commissioner Malcolm P. Hebert.

In 2020, Hurricane Laura caused significant damage to the zoo, including damaging more than 20 animal habitats, fences, roofs, and walkways. More than 70 trees were downed during the storm and the cougar habitat was destroyed; however, no animals were injured during the storm. The zoo remained closed until March 12, 2021, as repairs and improvements were made.

In 2024, the zoo lost its membership to the Association of Zoos & Aquariums.

== Exhibits and other facilities ==
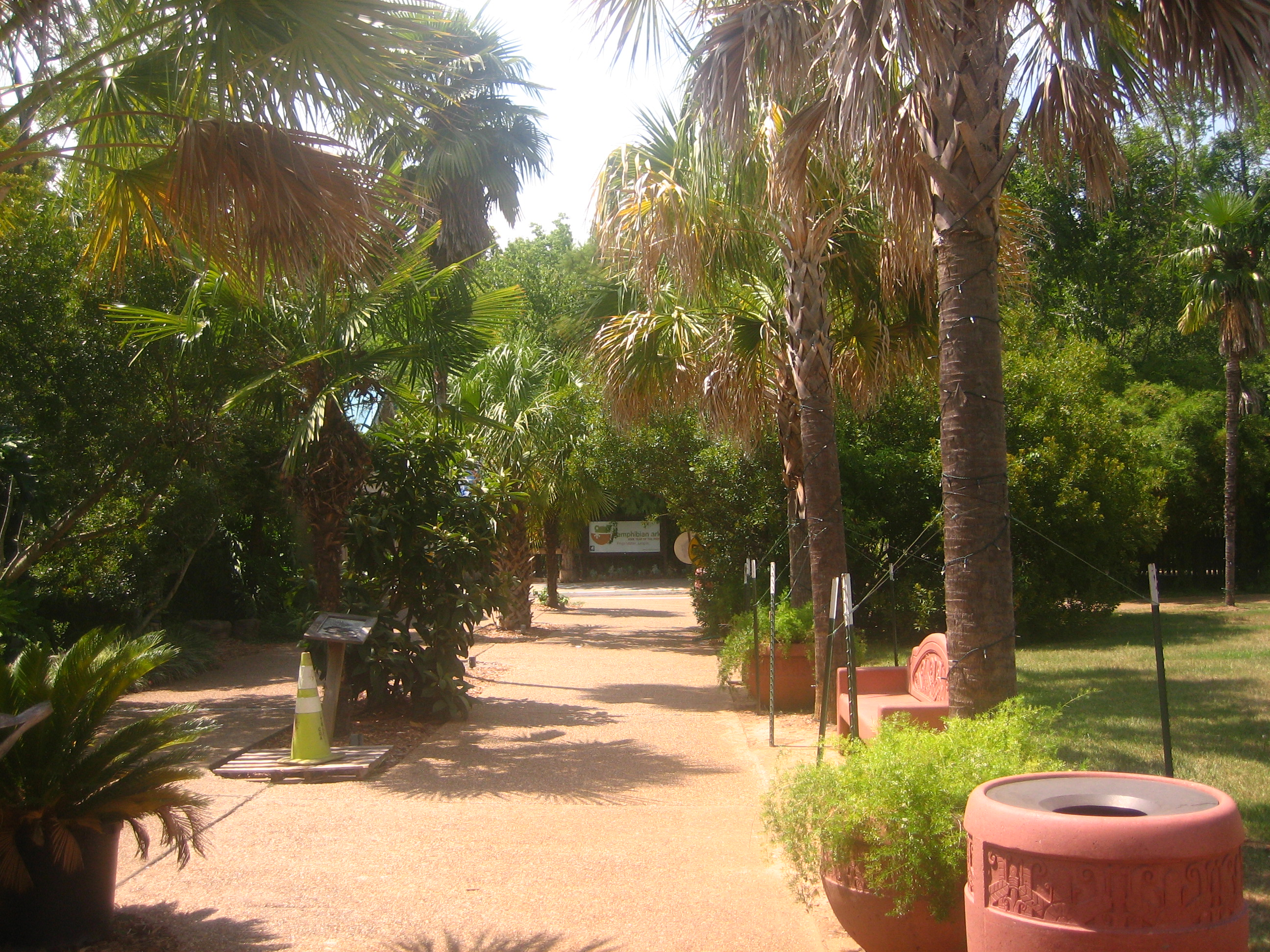
Greenery at Alexandria Zoo

In addition to its regular exhibits, the zoo has four themed habitat areas.

The zoo opened a small part of the African Experience in September 2003. The large naturalistic habitat for African lions includes large rock formations and a waterfall. This initial part of the exhibit also includes dwarf crocodiles and crested porcupines. Two new exhibits in this area opened in April 2004. One is home to the zoo's Aldabra and Galapagos tortoises, and the other is a "Venom Center" or African snake house. As of 2022, the African Experience continues to be expanded to include an African grasslands enclosure in existing, undeveloped zoo property that will house zebras, giraffes, pygmy hippos, and African birds.

Louisiana Habitat was opened in 1998, and features the plants, animals, architecture, industry and culture of Louisiana. Native species such as alligator, roseate spoonbill, North American river otter, cougar, black bear, bobcat, raccoon, red wolf, white-tailed deer and many others live in naturalistic exhibits depicting the marshes, swamps, and uplands of the state. Turtles, fish, otters, and alligators can be seen from an underwater viewing area. This exhibit received a "best public facility" award in 1998 from the Louisiana Contractors magazine, and a "Significant Achievement" award in 2002 from the AZA.

Bayou Le Zoo Choo Choo, the zoo's 2 ft (610 mm) narrow gauge miniature train, runs all year but only operates on weekends in January and February. It also runs during the zoo's Holiday Light Safari. The train depot is just to the left of the main entry area, and the train takes visitors all the way around the outside edge of the zoo.

== Conservation ==
As part of its conservation effort, the zoo participate in about 20 Species Survival Plans (SSP), including Andean condor, Chinese alligator, clouded leopard, colobus monkey, cotton-top tamarin, fishing cat, gibbon, golden lion tamarin, Indochinese tiger, jaguar, lion, lion-tailed macaque, Louisiana pine snake, maned wolf, ocelot, red wolf, spectacled bear, spider monkey, and toucan.

In addition to species involved in Species Survival Plans, the zoo is home to other threatened or endangered species, including African dwarf crocodile, American crocodile, American black bear, Bengal tiger, black howler monkey, Brazilian tapir, Galapagos tortoise, lowland anoa, Nile crocodile, Palawan peacock pheasant, red-handed tamarin, and red kangaroo.

Throughout the year, the zoo also sponsors special events to help promote conservation, including lectures, Party for the Planet, Wild Tie & Tennis Shoe Night, International Migratory Bird Day, Black Bear Awareness Day, and Endangered Species Day.

== 2015 cotton-top tamarin exposure deaths controversy ==
In January 2015, two critically endangered monkeys died at the zoo after a caretaker left them overnight outside in the cold. The cotton-top tamarin, weighing less than 1 pound (0.45 kg) each, were left outside on the night of 7 January, when temperatures reached a low of 30 °F (−1 °C). A third tamarin survived. People for the Ethical Treatment of Animals, which opposes zoos in general, called for a federal investigation into the deaths.
