= The Rapids Theatre =

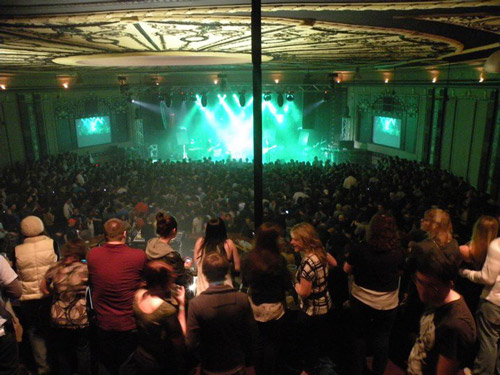
- Inside of The Rapids Theatre
- Interactive map of The Rapids Theatre
- Address: 1711 Main Street; Niagara Falls, NY; United States
- Coordinates: 43.10516°N 79.05273°W
- Owner: John Hutchins
- Capacity: 1,700
- Type: Concert Venue/Reception Hall

Construction
- Opened: 1921 as Bellevue Theatre
- Reopened: 2009 as The Rapids Theatre
- Architects: Leon H. Lempert & Sons

Website
- www.rapidstheatre.com

The Rapids Theatre is an indoor concert venue and events center situated in downtown Niagara Falls, New York. It hosts a variety of shows and events, including music concerts, comedy acts, wedding receptions, and corporate meetings. Some performances recently held at the Rapids include Passion Pit, Stone Temple Pilots, Pauly Shore, Morrissey, City and Colour, Thirty Seconds to Mars, Snoop Dogg, The Band Perry, Dropkick Murphys, Chevelle, the Headstones, and Eric Church. The venue was also featured on an episode of SyFy's Ghost Hunters that aired on October 19, 2011. The episode was appropriately titled "Stage Fright".

Originally constructed under the name of The Bellevue Theatre in 1921, it opened as a movie theatre and vaudeville stage, complete with a grand balcony and domed ceiling. After a long history of various ownerships and management changes, it most recently reopened as the Rapids Theatre in December 2009 on Main Street, Niagara Falls.

== Early history ==
The theatre first opened on North Main Street, Niagara Falls, NY on September 1, 1921 as a luxury movie house called The Bellevue Theatre. It also presented a variety of vaudeville acts through the RKO theatre company (Radio-Keith-Orpheum), one in particular being The Three Stooges. It was located in the same building as The Harmony Shop sheet music store and a family-run pharmacy.

The Bellevue was constructed under the architect by the name of Leon H. Lempert Jr. of Leon H Lempert & Sons architectural firm based in Rochester, New York and designed by interior decorator, William H Lusk. Ownership and operation of the theatre fell into the hands of local Niagarans, most of which held political and city council positions in the county:

- John Williamson (Treasurer)
- Frank Jenss (President)
- George Haeberle (Vice President)
- M. Arnson (Director)
- John O. Chapin (Secretary)
- D.H. Frank (Manager)

Other theatres along North Main Street during the Bellevue's first years were the Orpheum and the Elite. There were also 11 other theatres in the surrounding Buffalo area that presented movies, vaudeville acts, and plays, including the Hippodrome on Pine Avenue and Shea’s Performing Arts Center in downtown Buffalo. About 10 years later, the number of surrounding theatres expanded to 30, including the Cataract Theatre, and The Strand Theatre.

On Thursday, Sept. 1, 1921, the Buffalo News featured a story on the opening of the Bellevue called "The Theatre Beautiful Opens" and referred to the theatre as, “a monument to enterprise of loyal Niagarans, which matches the best in the state." In the 1920s, a Sunday matinee movie ticket for the most popular movies could be purchased for 28 cents. An advertisement run by the Niagara Gazette on March 30, 1929, stated that, “If it’s a good picture, the Bellevue will show it!”

In 1928, The Bellevue Theatre closed its doors only to be purchased one year later by the Shea-Publix Theatre Company, where they purchased a 21-year lease at a total rental cost of $900,000.

In the 1940s, Vincent McFaul, a subsidiary of Paramount Pictures, purchased the theatre from Shea-Publix. For their grand re-opening of The Bellevue, the world premier of Niagara Falls, a Hal Roach comedy about newlywed life starring Tom Brown, Marjorie Woodward, Zazu Pitts, and Slim Summerville, was held On October 25, 1941 at 8:00 p.m. Over 1,000 attended the film that local papers reviewed as being “one of the funniest comedies of the year”, including the acting mayor of Niagara Falls, John H. Keller.

Then, in the 1960s, it was purchased by the Strand Cataract Theatre Corp. and renamed The Rapids Theatre. Under new management of a woman named Miss Louise Marigia, many improvements and changes were made to the building. It was decorated with “flame red and green” furnishings and was described by local newspapers as being “splendid” and “handsome.” Also during this time, the theatre was credited as having the first marquee in Western New York to use the Wagner type changeable letter mounting with transparent Plexiglas rails. It was installed by a local business named Cooper Neon Sign Company. The Rapids held its grand opening on July 15, 1961 with a premier of the movie, Exodus (starring Paul Newman and Eva Marie Saint) in which over 800 people attended.

Eventually, business declined and the theatre, along with several other businesses in the economically stagnant Niagara Falls commercial district, closed down until it reopened in 1974 as The Late Show discothèque. That business lasted until 1995, was closed down, and then reopened as yet another dance club called The Masquerade in 1996. In 1998, it operated very briefly as a night club under the name, Centre Stage.

== Recent history and today ==
The building was sold in 1999 for $13,000 at a city foreclosure auction, to Robert D. Hyde It had a brief run in 2002 when it opened up as The Pleasure Dome. Two years later in 2004, the business was Purchased by Raymond Page who changed the night club into The Dome Theatre, where it held heavy and alternative rock performances by Slayer, Alice in Chains, DragonForce, The Deftones, The Offspring, and the controversial “Girls Gone Wild” Tour. It closed once again and was purchased at a tax foreclosure auction in 2007 by current owner and Niagara Falls native, John Hutchins, for $85,000.

The run-down building underwent several renovations totaling $1. 8 million and received assistance through a grant from the NFC Development Corporation, an agency of the City of Niagara Falls' Office of Economic Development which gives grants and loans to help businesses, in late 2008. The grant, which amounted to $250,000, came from the city's share of slots revenue from the Seneca Niagara Casino & Hotel located downtown. Renovations included new sound and lighting systems, an outdoor electronic marquee above the theatre doors, a maple-wood bar, and new floor, and art -deco plaster repaired walls. The newly renovated Rapids Theatre held its grand public opening on December 5, 2009, with a performance by the 17-piece, Toronto-based band, Classic Albums Live, in which The Beatles Sgt. Peppers Lonely Hearts Club Band album was covered.

Since then, several popular acts of all different musical genres and acts have made their way to the Rapids Theatre, including Stone Temple Pilots, The Shins, Eric Church, Our Lady Peace, The Deftones, The Used, The Headstones, Morrissey, Chevelle, Jason Michael Carroll, George Clinton & Parliament Funkadelic, Snoop Dogg, The Sheepdogs, City and Colour, Uncle Kracker, Fran Cosmo, The Band Perry, Blue October, Less Than Jake, Roscoe Dash, Xavier Rudd, David Cook, Josh Thompson, Primus, Five Finger Death Punch, Big Sugar, Kenny Wayne Shepherd, Mac Miller, Brantley Gilbert, The English Beat, Steel Panther, Easton Corbin, Brett Michaels, Dropkick Murphys, Thirty Seconds to Mars, Fall Out Boy, and the longest-running Broadway production of Smokey Joe’s Cafe.

Other non-musical acts to make their way to the Rapids most recently include comedians Gallagher and Pauly Shore and the local Buffalo Niagara Film Festival. The theatre also specializes in wedding receptions, charity banquets, private parties, and corporate events.

The venue is also popularly known as one of Western New York's haunted destinations. On October 19, 2011, the theatre was featured on an episode of SyFy's Ghost Hunters. The episode was appropriately titled "Stage Fright" and described the story of a young actress who supposedly hung herself in the back of the theatre. There have been several reports of mysterious whistling, loud footsteps, moving objects and doors closing. On October 13, 2012, the theatre hosted its first public ghost hunt.

After almost a year of no shows or events at the Rapids Theatre it was announced in November of 2024 that the city of Niagara Falls would buy the venue out of foreclosure yet again for $800,000. As of the spring of 2025 there has been no word on if or when events will be held at the Rapids Theatre again.

== Structure and interior design ==
The Rapids Theatre rests on one of downtown Niagara Falls busiest commercial streets, Main Street, and is only five minutes away from the Canada–US border. It has a large parking lot in the rear of the building and sits next door to a brand new police station. It is a 19,260-square-foot (1,789 m^{2}) brick and concrete building, able to seat 800 people, 300 for table events, and up to 1,750 people standing for live concerts. Unlike the classic theatre-style seating that the Rapids used to have permanently installed, all chairs and tables in the facility can be removed and designed according to each show and event.

There is a large tiled-floored front lobby with marble accessories that slopes up into the main portion of the theatre, which contains a large blue and white domed ceiling, a grand balcony for VIP seating, a concession stand, wood paneled floors, and columned walls. The interior design of the theatre has a vintage and historical look, adorned with crimson, gold, and black accents that match the original style of the 1920s. There is a large, maple-wood bar in the back center of the theatre and a bar on the left side of the balcony as well. Offices, meeting rooms, and dressing rooms are located on the upper level of the theatre. Two large projector screens hang to the right and left of the stage, directly in front of the elevated floor sections.

== Other early movie showings ==
About a month after The Bellevue's 1921 opening, the theatre premiered the movie Handcuffs or Kisses featuring Elaine Hammerstein and a short film called, Figure It Out Yourself. On March 30, 1929, Shea's debuted The Wolf on Wall Street, starring George Bancroft. This was one of the first films shown with “100% Talking Pictures equipped with RCA Photophone,” the latest in sound/voice technology at that time. An adult matinee ticket cost 25 cents.

On November 26, 1930, the theatre held a week-long Thanksgiving special premier of “Paramount’s comedy, Her Wedding Night, featuring Clara Bow. A reviewer for the Niagara Gazette described the actress as, “the famous red haired ‘it’ girl vies for honors with Charlie Ruggles, ‘Skeets’ Gallagher, and Ralph Forbes."

Other movies shown by the theatre between 1921 and 1931 included, The Doctor’s Secret, The Canary Murder Case, Interference, The Night Club, The Wild Party, Chinatown Charlie, Eternal Love, Lummox, Nothing But The Truth, Lady of the Pavements, The Betrayal, The Letter, Coquette, The Dummy, She Goes to War, Alibi, and The Leatherneck.
