= Jules Desurmont Worsted Company Mill =

- U.S. National Register of Historic Places
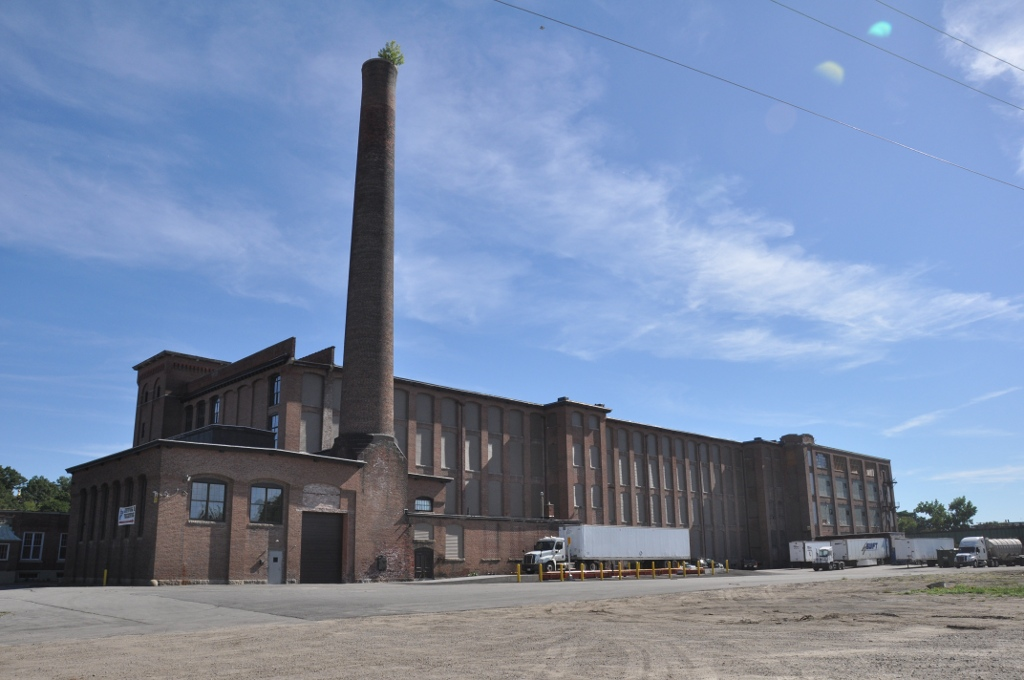

- Location within Rhode Island Location within the United States
- Location: 84 Fairmount St., Woonsocket, Rhode Island
- Coordinates: 42°0′9″N 71°31′21″W
- Area: 6.4 acres (2.6 ha)
- Built: 1907
- Architect: Bishop, J.W.
- NRHP reference No.: 06001257
- Added to NRHP: January 12, 2007

The Jules Desurmont Worsted Company Mill is a historic mill at 84 Fairmount Street in Woonsocket, Rhode Island. The mill complex consists of three brick buildings, erected 1907-10 by Jules Desurmont, the owner of a textile firm in Tourcoing, a city in northern France, who had been drawn to Woonsocket by the promotional activities of Aram Pothier. The mill produced French worsted wool yarn until 1952, and was used for many years thereafter by smaller textile and industrial concerns.

The mill complex was listed on the National Register of Historic Places in 2007.

== See also ==
- National Register of Historic Places listings in Providence County, Rhode Island
