= Expedition Unknown =

American reality television series

- Genre: Documentary; Reality; Adventure; Travel
- Presented by: Josh Gates
- Country of origin: United States
- Original language: English
- No. of seasons: 17
- No. of episodes: 159+

Production
- Executive producers: Brad Kuhlman; Casey Brumels; Josh Gates; Brea Tisdale
- Editors: Jesse Wright, Nicholas Caramonta, Robert Claridge, Marc Femenella, Dustin Peterson, Scott Simmons, Ben Simoff
- Running time: 42-84 minutes
- Production company: Ping Pong Productions

Original release
- Network: Travel Channel (2015–2018); Discovery Channel (2018–present)
- Release: January 8, 2015 – present

Related
- Destination Truth; Stranded; Legendary Locations; Expedition X; Josh Gates Tonight

Expedition Unknown is an American reality television series produced by Ping Pong Productions, which follows host Josh Gates as he investigates mysteries and legends. In each episode, Gates meets with historians, archaeologists, salvage operations, or treasure hunters to join their search for historical evidence or lost treasure. The series premiered on January 8, 2015, and aired its first four seasons on the Travel Channel before moving to the Discovery Channel in 2018. The sixteenth season premiered on November 5, 2025.

The series has launched spin-offs including Expedition X, Josh Gates Tonight, and Expedition Files.

== Episodes ==
=== Series overview ===
Season	Episodes	Originally released	
Season	Episodes	First released	Last released
1	12	January 8, 2015	April 2, 2015
2	20	October 7, 2015	June 22, 2016
3	18	November 2, 2016	June 14, 2017
4	10	December 27, 2017	February 28, 2018
5	7	May 30, 2018	September 6, 2018
6	9	April 7, 2019	May 29, 2019
7	13	August 8, 2019	October 31, 2019
8	8	February 6, 2020	March 25, 2020
9	6	July 21, 2021	August 25, 2021
10	14	May 25, 2022	August 31, 2022
11	8	May 24, 2023	July 12, 2023
12	8	November 15, 2023	January 3, 2024
13	7	June 19, 2024	July 31, 2024
14	6	October 9, 2024	November 20, 2024
15	7	June 18, 2025	August 6, 2025
16	6	November 5, 2025	December 10, 2025
17	TBA	June 24, 2026	TBA
EF	TBD	March 30, 2016	TBD
YETI	4	October 5, 2016	October 26, 2016
ET	4	October 4, 2017	October 25, 2017
AL	4	October 7, 2018	October 28, 2018
AS	TBD	October 4, 2017	TBD
BTTF	4	March 15, 2021	March 15, 2021

=== Season 1 (2015) ===
No.	Title	Original release date	U.S. viewers (millions)
1.1	"Amelia Earhart"	January 8, 2015	N/A
Josh seeks new evidence on the disappearance of Amelia Earhart. He first sets off to Papua New Guinea, where he treks through the uncharted jungle of tribal lands; then Fiji, where he tries to discover her remains.
1.2	"Temple of Doom"	January 15, 2015	0.78
In a search for a lost city, Josh goes to the remote and landmine-riddled jungles of Cambodia to investigate the ancient Khmer Empire to find a Linga stone, a 1,000-year-old relic that, legend has it, was used by the God King to incinerate his enemies.
1.3	"World's 8th Wonder"	January 22, 2015	0.85
Josh's hunt for the Amber chamber takes him to Catherine Palace in St. Petersburg, Russia. Then in Germany, he retraces the steps of Nazi soldiers who looted the treasure in WWII as he explores abandoned bunkers and a silver mine in hopes of finding the chamber.
1.4	"The Legend of Jesse James"	January 29, 2015	N/A
Josh searches the American Midwest for outlaw Jesse James' "gold loot," which he and his gang stole in Mexico. He walks a mile in James's boots, from his farm in Kearney, Missouri to Robbers Cave, where he rappels off a cliff to find this hidden treasure, then to Cement, Oklahoma, to join a team using high-tech equipment in Buzzard’s Roost.
1.5	"City of Gold"	February 5, 2015	0.86
Josh travels through Peru in search of the Incan lost city of Paititi. His journey takes him from Cusco to Machu Picchu and into the Amazon's jungles.
1.6	"Viking Sunstone"	February 12, 2015	0.92
Josh tries to unlock the secrets to the Sunstone of the Vikings while traveling through the British island of Alderney and Norway, where he explores a crypt underneath Nidaros Cathedral to find the final resting place of Viking king St. Olaf. Later, he descends into a 37-mile-long (60 km) calcite mine to make his own sunstone, testing its power while at sea with locals who live like Vikings.
1.7	"Captain Morgan's Lost Gold"	February 19, 2015	1.01
Josh joins archaeologists in Panama as they search for the Satisfaction, the sunken flagship of pirate Captain Henry Morgan. He also searches one of many shipwrecks near Fort San Lorenzo at the reef, where Morgan's ship ran aground.
1.8	"Code to Gold"	February 26, 2015	0.93
Josh searches the Virginia backcountry for the Thomas Beale treasure. He meets up with local treasure hunters and explores a 4-mile search radius in Bedford County using a printed copy of the Declaration of Independence, believed to have hidden symbols that James B. Ward, “The Beale Papers” author, encoded. He then meets with a crypto-analyst to get further evidence on the hoax.
1.9	"Mayan Apocalypse"	March 5, 2015	0.83
Josh investigates the fall of the Mayan Empire. He explores the many cenotes— caverns believed to be gateways to the underworld—below the jungles and ruins of Mexico, including the largest Mayan city, Chichén Itzá. While scuba diving in the dark Holtun Cenote, he unearths human skulls and ancient sacrificial altars, which get him closer to why their empire collapsed.
1.10	"Secrets of the Nazca"	March 19, 2015	0.97
Josh flies to Peru to investigate the giant geoglyphs known as the Nazca Lines that were drawn into the desert by the ancient Nazca tribe. By studying newly found lines recently discovered on a mountain made by the Paracas people and joining a Nazca psychedelic ritual, he uncovers the supposed meaning behind the tracings.
1.11	"Samurai Sword of Power"	March 26, 2015	0.86
Josh heads to Japan to search for the missing Honjo Masamune sword. After learning about the legend of this katana, his search takes him to the back alleys of Tokyo and the city's red-light district, an ancestral burial ground, Imperial tunnels in Nagano, and an ancient mountaintop Shinto shrine in Togakushi.
1.12	"Curse of the Golden Bell"	April 2, 2015	0.72
Josh travels to Myanmar to join in the search for the Golden Bell of King Dhammazedi, believed to be sunk at the bottom in the center of the Bago River, the Yangon River and the Pazundaung Creek when Portuguese warlord Filipe de Brito e Nicote's ship was wrecked in 1599 after stealing it.

=== Season 2 (2015–16) ===
No.	Title	Original release date	U.S. viewers (millions)
2.1	"The Quest for King Arthur"	October 7, 2015	0.60
Josh investigates whether King Arthur was real and, if so, who he was. He searches in Arthur's reputed birthplace at Tintagel Castle in Cornwall, and then in the ruins of Glastonbury Abbey in Somerset, the site of the alleged tomb of King Arthur and Queen Guinevere. Finally, he visits Dunadd in Scotland, where he meets an author who believes a Scot named Arthur MacAedan is the historical basis of King Arthur.
2.2	"Genghis Khan's Tomb"	October 14, 2015	0.63
Josh researches the legends about Genghis Khan to search for his long-lost tomb. It is believed to be in Mongolia at the "forbidden zone" on top of the "Holy Mountain" or Burkhan Khaldun, which is guarded by a local tribe and closed off to foreigners.
2.3	"Blackbeard's Hidden Gold"	October 21, 2015	0.55
Josh goes searching for Blackbeard's buried gold. He explores underwater caves in Cayman Brac, gets up close to his wrecked flagship Queen Anne's Revenge, and drives the Outer Banks on North Carolina's coast to dig up artifacts on Ocracoke Island, the site of his last stand.
2.4	"Hunting Vampires"	October 28, 2015	0.52
Josh digs up the truth behind vampire legends. He starts at Curtea Veche in Romania, where he learns about Vlad the Impaler, the inspiration behind Dracula. Then off to Marotinu de Sus, a Romanian village, where six men desecrated a grave, believing it to be a "strigoi." He ends in Perperikon, Bulgaria, to examine a supposed vampire grave.
2.5	"The Real Robin Hood"	November 4, 2015	0.52
Josh travels the English countryside on a mission to learn if Robin Hood was a real man and if he's a legendary hero or a murderous outlaw. He visits London's British Library, explores tunnels and caves beneath Nottingham, and joins historians in search of Hood's grave, in Kirklees Priory, Yorkshire, and at a churchyard in Loxley, where researchers believe an outlaw named Roger Godberd, the real Robin Hood is buried.
2.6	"Finding Fenn's Fortune"	November 18, 2015	0.46
Josh searches for the treasure of art dealer Forrest Fenn, who, after being diagnosed with terminal cancer, hid his $2 million fortune deep in the Rocky Mountains north of his hometown of Santa Fe, New Mexico.
2.7	"Columbus Unearthed"	December 9, 2015	0.66
The search for Christopher Columbus continues with finding his missing remains. Josh follows his five-century voyage across two continents to search for his final resting place, believed to be at Columbus Lighthouse in Santo Domingo, Dominican Republic and at Cathedral of Saint Mary of the See in Seville, Spain, both countries laying claim to his bones.
2.8	"Japan's Atlantis"	December 16, 2015	0.63
Josh goes to Yonaguni Island, the westernmost Japanese island on the East China Sea, to determine whether undersea structures are geological or artificial. The Yonaguni Monument discoverer, Kihachiro Aratake, shows him the undersea steps leading up to a level platform where Josh takes a sample for geologic analysis. In Osaka, archaeologist Michio Maezano shows Josh a rock tomb proving that ancient people could have carved the Yonaguni structures, and an earthquake could have sunk them. Geologist Masahide Furukawa examines the rock sample composed of layered sandstone and shale, and a stress test causes it to break along bedding planes, forming a flat surface, concluding the Yonaguni monument is a natural product of tectonics and wave action.
2.9	"True Cross of Christ"	December 23, 2015	0.88
Josh searches for the True Cross, a relic said to have mystical healing powers. He visits Jerusalem, Israel and Istanbul, Turkey to find it. It was cut into three pieces on the orders of Empress Helena. He examines this legend at the Church of the Holy Sepulchre in the Old City, where the tomb of Jesus is located and where he was crucified. Then he learns more about crucifixion in Tel Aviv and discovers ancient cross wall carvings at the Church of the Nativity in Bethlehem. Next, he heads to the Ayasofya in Constantinople, where priests hid pieces under the Hippodrome. Lastly, he joins archaeologists at a dig in Sinop, Turkey.
2.10	"The Sultan's Heart"	January 6, 2016	0.63
Josh hunts for the Heart of Suleiman the Magnificent, ruler of the Ottoman Empire in the 16th century. When Suleiman died in 1566 during a battle in Hungary, his body was brought back to Istanbul, but not before a ritual was performed to remove his heart, place it in a gold container, and bury it beneath his tent. The Sultan's followers believed he had magical powers and continued to beat, waiting to be returned to its host. The town of Tubek was built over the burial site to honor the Sultan. Invaders destroyed this now-lost city a century later, and the heart vanished.
2.11	"Africa's Gold Hoard"	January 13, 2016	0.70
Josh travels to South Africa to search for the missing Kruger Millions, the gold coins of the country's entire financial reserve, which vanished overnight after South African President Paul Kruger loaded the hoard on a train in 1900 during the Boer War.
2.12	"Kalahari Desert's Lost City"	January 27, 2016	0.68
Josh searches for a lost city in the Kalahari Desert in Africa. First discovered by circus pioneer The Great Farini in 1885, he supposedly came across the ruins of a lost city half-buried in the sand. Those who followed in his footsteps came up empty-handed and claimed it a hoax, while others vanished. Josh joins a modern explorer who's launched an all-new expedition.
2.13	"Yamashita's Gold"	February 10, 2016	0.74
Josh searches for Yamashita's Gold, millions of dollars in Southeast Asian gold and jewels looted by Japan and covertly transported to the Philippines under the direction of Japanese general Tomoyuki Yamashita during WWII. The fortune was hidden by gangsters, military generals, and a secret organization in tunnels and caves. Still, it was lost when the Allies won the war, until a treasure hunter found part of it in 1970, and has been searching for it ever since.
2.14	"Columbus: Legend or Liar?"	February 17, 2016	0.59
Josh investigates the myths behind Christopher Columbus. He is an epic hero to some, to others, a bloodthirsty conqueror. He learns the truth about the explorer's early years, nationality, and real discoveries.
2.15	"Secrets of Shangri-La"	March 2, 2016	0.64
Josh searches high in the Himalayas for Shangri-La to learn of its legend as a hidden utopia. In the most remote reaches of Nepal near the border of Tibet is an area known as the Mustang, that's been closed off to the outside world and the passage of time. But now Josh and his fellow archaeologists have been granted access to explore it. He finds secrets hiding inside its sky caves and artificial chambers carved into cliff walls.
2.16	"Shangri-La Found"	March 9, 2016	0.83
After learning about the ancient Buddhist realm of Shambhala in Kathmandu and exploring the sky caves, Josh continues his search for the real Shangri-La. He discovers a rock tower used for human burials and filled with bones dating back to 800 A.D. Next, he travels to Lo Manthang for another day of investigation in the Martzon area to climb a cave system called Pumamba, which is linked to the legend. Then he heads to Chuusang, a remote cave monastery that has never been excavated.
2.17	"Lost Mexican City"	June 1, 2016	0.68
Josh searches for the civilization of Teotihuacan, a lost empire left behind in Mexico with pyramids dedicated to the gods, temples, and a treasure trove of cryptic art. He seeks answers on who these indigenous people were, finds out their secrets that have been buried for 2,000 years, and what they left behind.
2.18	"Incan King's Mummy"	June 8, 2016	0.73
Josh searches for the lost mummy of Atahualpa, the last king of the Incan empire, hidden high in the Andes Mountains and in the jungles and highlands of Ecuador. His reign ended when Spanish Conquistador Francisco Pizarro murdered him and brought the Inca civilization to an end. His body was mummified in a ritual that supposedly gave him sway over the world of the living. Then, his body vanished, and archaeologists have been searching ever since.
2.19	"Nazi Gold Train"	June 15, 2016	0.76
Josh exposes Nazi secrets as he searches for the lost fortune of war criminal Adolf Hitler's billions in gold, art, and relics stolen on his orders by the Nazis. They also built networks of hidden tunnels and bunkers. Today, archaeologists use modern technology to recover treasure and excavate the underground legacy of the Third Reich. Josh joins them, first finding answers in Germany, identifying gold in a Nazi train hidden inside a mountain in Poland. Then, an underground facility in Austria, to build a top-secret lab and a war machine.
2.20	"Nazi Gold and Atomic Secrets"	June 22, 2016	0.94
The search for Nazi secrets and their stolen gold continues underground and underwater. Josh dives for relics of the Nazi foreign minister Joachim Von Ribbontrop who sank his family's entire fortune in Lake Fuschlsee in the Austrian Alps. To learn if the Nazis were building an atomic bomb, he starts his quest in Hitler's hometown of Linz. Then, he stops at the Mauthausen-Gusen concentration camp memorial in Sankt Georgen an der Gusen to pay his respects to the hundreds of thousands who perished here. He also explores 25 miles of tunnel under the Bergkristall complex, the largest secret underground facility ever built. It was designed by SS General Hans Kammler to oversee the Nazi's nuclear project.

=== Season 3 (2016–17) ===
No.	Title	Original release date	U.S. viewers (millions)
3.1	"Plummer's Gold"	November 2, 2016	0.70
Josh sets off for gold rush country to search for the lost fortune of a Montana sheriff. He explores hidden cave systems and blows open a mine sealed for over a century.
3.2	"The Lost Tomb of Attila the Hun"	November 9, 2016	0.87
Josh travels to Hungary to join three archaeological teams looking for the lost tomb of Attila the Hun. Legends and ancient texts lead the search from the bottom of the Danube to the mountain forests outside of Budapest.
3.3	"The Vanished Empire"	November 16, 2016	0.90
On the Mediterranean island of Crete, the Minoans built one of the most glorious ancient civilizations, then vanished. Josh travels to Greece to discover exactly how Europe's first superpower disappeared.
3.4	"The Lost Colony of Roanoke"	November 23, 2016	0.77
Josh joins leading archaeologists as they investigate America's first missing-persons case, the lost colony of Roanoke.
3.5	"Cloning the Woolly Mammoth"	December 28, 2016	1.03
To help clone the extinct woolly mammoth back to life, Josh visits the Korean biotech lab driving the project and excavates ancient bones in a working Canadian gold mine. He then descends into a vast sinkhole in Siberia to unearth frozen DNA.
3.6	"Journey to the Ice Age"	January 4, 2017	0.96
To find a viable sample of mammoth DNA, Josh retrieves bone samples from the massive Batagay crater, then journeys far upriver to a site in the Siberian wilderness where tusk hunters carve out troves of bones from the permafrost. He takes the DNA samples to the lab and watches the process of treating and testing the specimens. At last, he views the DNA results to determine if the woolly mammoth will walk the earth again.
3.7	"Cracking the D.B. Cooper Case"	January 11, 2017	0.94
Josh investigates the only unsolved plane hijacking in US history. He joins private individuals hunting for D.B. Cooper in the Pacific Northwest. He discovers new clues and theories before jumping out of a plane, as Cooper did.
3.8	"Lasseter's Gold"	January 18, 2017	0.91
Josh sets off deep into the Australian Outback, following the footsteps of explorer Harold Lasseter, who claims to have found a vast field of gold. He speaks to two of Australia's Lasseter experts.
3.9	"Tracking Tasmania's Tiger"	January 25, 2017	0.92
Josh goes to Tasmania to investigate sightings of the supposedly extinct thylacine, the tasmanian tiger. Recent eyewitness accounts and photographic evidence suggest it may not be extinct.
3.10	"Captain Kidd's Treasure"	February 22, 2017	0.89
Josh retraces the footsteps of Captain Kidd to find his buried treasure. From the East Coast to the Caribbean, the search takes him to a real pirate shipwreck and the island hideout of the buccaneer.
3.11	"Africa's Cursed Lake of Gold"	March 1, 2017	0.92
Josh journeys to the wilds of Namibia to embark on a deep dive in Lake Otjikoto for a long lost WWI treasure.
3.12	"The Ark of the Covenant"	March 8, 2017	0.92
Josh emulates Indiana Jones as he searches in Israel and Ethiopia for the lost Ark of the Covenant, the relic said to contain the Ten Commandments.
3.13	"England's Vanished Crown Jewels"	March 15, 2017	1.04
Josh tries to find the lost treasure of King John. He explores the marshlands of England to find the king's crown jewels, which were swept away in a freak tidal surge in the 13th century.
3.14	"Corsica's Nazi Treasure"	March 22, 2017	0.92
Josh hunts for the hidden treasure of Erwin Rommel, a Nazi general who plundered the wealth of North Africa as his tank corps fled the continent. The search brings him to never-explored underground lakes and undersea relics of WWII.
3.15	"Italy's Barbarian Booty"	May 31, 2017	0.93
To find the plundered riches of the Roman Empire, Josh looks for the tomb of the Visigoth king Alaric in Italy. The hunt extends from Rome to the southern city of Cosenza, where the mayor is spearheading an effort to find the tomb.
3.16	"India's Atlantis"	June 7, 2017	0.92
Josh travels to India in search of Dwarka, a mythical kingdom swallowed by the ocean. To find evidence that the golden city is real, he dives into the Arabian Sea and visits a dig site.
3.17	"Lost Spanish Fortune Found!"	June 14, 2017	0.92
Josh travels to the coast of Florida and Cuba in search of a sunken treasure from a fleet of Spanish ships sunk in 1715; the hunt takes him deep into the Atlantic and the National Archives of Cuba.

=== Season 4 (2017–18) ===
No.	Title	Original release date	U.S. viewers (millions)
4.1	"Viking Secrets"	December 27, 2017	N/A
Josh investigates how a group of Norse tribesmen gained power in medieval Europe, traveling to Denmark and Iceland.
4.2	"Vikings in America"	January 3, 2018	N/A
Josh follows the Vikings' westward expansion from Iceland to Greenland and North America.
4.3	"Origins of Stonehenge"	January 10, 2018	N/A
Josh travels to Britain to explore the origins of Stonehenge and views a selection of monuments.
4.4	"The Secret"	January 17, 2018	N/A
Josh travels all over the US to attempt to find the treasures featured in The Secret, a cryptic book published in the 1980s. He meets with members of the book's following, who each think they're about to find one of the ten remaining treasures.
4.5	"Butch Cassidy's Lost Loot"	January 24, 2018	N/A
Josh investigates Butch Cassidy's missing money in Colorado, Utah, and Nevada.
4.6	"Hunt For The Metal Library"	January 31, 2018	N/A
Josh goes to the jungles of Ecuador to explore a flooded cave, looking for some metal plates.
4.7	"Great Women of Ancient Egypt"	February 7, 2018	N/A
Josh goes to Egypt to investigate Hatshepsut, Nefertiti, and Cleopatra.
4.8	"Egypt's Lost Queens"	February 14, 2018	N/A
Josh continues to investigate Hatshepsut, Nefertiti, and Cleopatra.
4.9	"Global Game Show: Out of This World"	February 21, 2018	N/A
Game show on the theme of extraterrestrials
4.10	"Secrets of Brother XII"	February 28, 2018	N/A
Josh attempts to uncover a treasure left behind by the Aquarian Foundation.

=== Season 5 (2018) ===
Season 5 started on Tuesday May 29, 2018. The series moved to the Discovery Channel for its 5th season.

No.	Title	Original release date	U.S. viewers (millions)
5.1	"Pyramid of Legends"	July 12, 2018	N/A
Josh ventures into the ancient Mayan city of El Mirador, searching for the lost tombs of a mysterious ruling dynasty called the Snake Kings.
5.2	"Lost City Of El Mirador"	July 19, 2018	N/A
Josh concludes his investigation into the mysterious Maya city of El Mirador, from the possible burial of the elusive Snake Kings to uncovering the secrets behind the fall of one of history's greatest ancient cities.
5.3	"Nazis In Argentina"	July 26, 2018	N/A
Josh ventures to Argentina, where many Nazi SS officers escaped after WWII.
5.4	"Lost Gold Of Jean Lafitte"	August 3, 2018	N/A
Josh goes to the American South to uncover the mystery of real-life buccaneer Jean Laffite and the location of his hidden treasure.
5.5	"Mahogany Ship"	August 10, 2018	N/A
Josh searches along Australia's infamous Shipwreck Coast for the missing Mahogany Ship.
5.6	"Hunt for the Ruby Slippers"	August 17, 2018	N/A
Josh investigates the theft of one of the most iconic pieces of Hollywood memorabilia of all time -- the ruby slippers worn by Judy Garland in the 1939 movie, The Wizard of Oz.
5.7	"Solved: Mystery of the Lost Ruby Slippers"	September 6, 2018	N/A
With updates following the recovery of the ruby slippers - Josh investigates the theft of one of the most iconic pieces of Hollywood memorabilia of all time: the ruby slippers worn by Judy Garland in the 1939 movie, The Wizard of Oz.

=== Season 6 (2019) ===
No.	Title	Original release date	U.S. viewers (millions)
6.1	"Egypt Live"	April 7, 2019	N/A
Josh gains access to an underground tomb complex, where a sealed sarcophagus may contain the identity of a mummy who has remained a mystery for 3,000 years.
6.2	"Deciphering the Last Nazi Code"	April 10, 2019	N/A
Josh ventures into the former Third Reich in search of an elusive Nazi fortune hidden with a code allegedly created by Adolf Hitler's private secretary and embedded into a piece of sheet music.
6.3	"Mysteries of Jesus"	April 17, 2019	N/A
Josh journeys to the Holy Land to discover where Jesus was born; his investigation leads to potentially explosive revelations that may change people's understanding of Jesus' origin story.
6.4	"Atlantis of the Andes"	April 24, 2019	N/A
Josh dives into a mystery of Lake Titicaca in South America and discovers multiple structures of the ancient Tiwanaku people, including ruins dubbed the Atlantis of the Andes.
6.5	"Lost Gold of Scotland"	May 1, 2019	N/A
Josh heads to Scotland to search for a huge gold reserve hidden after the Jacobite Uprising of 1745. He joins treasure hunters chasing a lead across the Highlands.
6.6	"Ghost Ship of the Great Lakes"	May 8, 2019	N/A
Josh uses a state-of-the-art two-man submersible to find The Griffon, the first ship lost in the Great Lakes.
6.7	"Legend of the Crystal Skull"	May 15, 2019	N/A
Josh takes on Central America's jungles to investigate the legendary crystal skull discovered by a renowned adventurer who inspired the movie character Indiana Jones.
6.8	"America's Lost WWII Hero"	May 22, 2019	N/A
Josh explores the case of WASP pilot Gertrude "Tommy" Tompkins, who went missing in her P-51 Mustang during WWII; he joins search teams using modern technology to locate Tompkins' lost aircraft.
6.9	"The Hunt for the Golden Owl"	May 29, 2019	N/A
Josh uses a book of riddles with cryptic clues and joins treasure hunters using new leads to find the Golden Owl statuette hidden somewhere in France.

=== Season 7 (2019) ===
No.	Title	Original release date	U.S. viewers (millions)
7.1	"Mysteries Of The Dead Sea Scrolls"	August 8, 2019	N/A
Josh travels to the Holy Land to dig in with an archaeologist who recently discovered new Dead Sea Scrolls. He also sees cutting-edge technology restoring scroll fragments in a way that could change how we read the Bible.
7.2	"Treasure of the Copper Scroll"	August 15, 2019	N/A
Josh investigates a unique Dead Sea Scroll etched with riddles that could lead to an ancient treasure. Then, he treks into the punishing Jordanian desert in search of the potential fortune.
7.3	"Chasing the Fortune of Sir Francis Drake"	August 22, 2019	N/A
Josh searches land and sea for the lost fortune of legendary pirate Sir Francis Drake. Joining treasure hunters and maritime archaeologists, he hunts for a lost cache of Spanish gold and the remains of Drake himself.
7.4	"Mystery of Dead Mountain"	August 29, 2019	N/A
Braving the sub-zero conditions of Siberia, Josh investigates one of the strangest and most brutal cold cases: the Dyatlov Pass incident. Nine Soviet hikers died suspiciously and sixty years later, no one knows how or why.
7.5	"Siberia's Coldest Case"	September 5, 2019	N/A
Josh concludes his in-depth investigation of the Dyatlov Pass Incident. Taking on Dead Mountain's brutal conditions, he and two investigators retrace the hikers' last steps, and a big discovery could finally solve the mystery.
7.6	"The Search for Florida's Lost Pirate"	September 12, 2019	N/A
Josh sets sail for Florida, chasing the long-lost treasure of José Gaspar. He joins marine archaeologists and treasure hunters working to crack the mysteries of the pirate's life so they can find the riches he left behind.
7.7	"Hunt For The Chupacabra"	September 19, 2019	N/A
In the dark caves and thick jungles of Puerto Rico, Josh tracks a possible chupacabra.
7.8	"Lost Tomb of the Mummy"	September 19, 2019	N/A
Josh heads to an active dig site in Egypt, where he joins famous archaeologist Dr. Zahi Hawass on the cusp of an incredible discovery: the mummy of an ancient high priest.
7.9	"Chasing the Snake Kings"	September 25, 2019	N/A
With a potential breakthrough in the search for a Snake King tomb, Josh returns to the jungles of Guatemala and the archaeological dig at the ancient Mayan city of El Mirador; the archaeologists attempt to pinpoint the tomb's location.
7.10	"Cracking the Secret"	October 2, 2019	N/A
Josh is on a nationwide treasure hunt to solve a mystery no one has cracked for 40 years: The Secret. He travels coast-to-coast and back in time using cutting-edge augmented reality and tapping into a network of obsessed Secret detectives.
7.11	"Gold Rush of the Atlantic"	October 10, 2019	N/A
Josh has a fresh lead on the massive lost treasure of the shipwrecked 1715 Spanish fleet. He returns to Florida's Atlantic coast and dives in with a new expedition that uses the latest tech to locate the fleet's flagship.
7.12	"Search For The Sultan's Heart"	October 17, 2019	N/A
Four years after Josh went on a journey to find the lost heart of Sultan Suleiman the Magnificent, he travels to the newly rediscovered town of Turbek for some shocking new revelations about the case.
7.13	"The Secret Solved"	October 31, 2019	N/A
Breaking news sends Josh racing across the globe. One of the wickedly hard puzzles of The Secret, which he has been chasing for years, might have been solved, and while he's been crisscrossing the US, this solution is in his hometown.

=== Season 8 (2020) ===
No.	Title	Original release date	U.S. viewers (millions)
8.1	"Digging Into D-Day"	February 5, 2020	1.515
Josh touches down in Normandy to investigate land, air, and sea battles. The expedition reveals a Nazi threat greater than ever imagined, unearthing a massive German bunker complex buried for 75 years.
8.2	"Searching for America's Lost Flight"	February 12, 2020	1.510
The mysterious vanishing of Northwest Flight 2501 with 58 people aboard.
8.3	"Hunting Our Ancient Ancestors"	February 19, 2020	1.264
In search of humanity's origins, Josh joins researchers in Tanzania who are unearthing traces of human ancestors at the prehistoric site Laetoli. He witnesses the predatory behavior of lions and joins a traditional hunt with the Hadza people.
8.4	"Revealing Our Ancient Ancestors"	February 26, 2020	1.192
Josh continues his exploration of human evolution, observing chimpanzees at Gombe Stream National Park. In South Africa, he delves into the Sterkfontein caves where the Australopithecus Little Foot was discovered and visited a prehistoric archaeological site in Pondoland.
8.5	"The Warrior Queen's Treasure"	March 4, 2020	1.436
Searching across England, Josh unearths a cache of ancient treasure as he chases the legend of Queen Boudica, the legendary Celtic queen who nearly defeated the invading Roman army 2,000 years ago.
8.6	"The Fortune of the Buzzard"	March 11, 2020	1.227
Josh takes on the Indian Ocean's punishing waters as he chases the lost treasure of Olivier Levasseur, AKA "The Buzzard," rumored to be worth more than a billion dollars.
8.7	"Mysteries of Bermuda Triangle"	March 18, 2020	1.374
Josh dives into the mysteries of the Bermuda Triangle. His investigation leads him to the ocean floor, the skies above, and even the edge of space as he tackles some of the most intriguing disappearances in history.
8.8	"Revealing the Bermuda Triangle"	March 25, 2020	1.441
Concluding his epic investigation, Josh uses cutting-edge technology to investigate the Triangle's most infamous shipwreck and lost flights.

=== Season 9 (2021) ===
No.	Title	Original release date	U.S. viewers (millions)
9.1	"Dillinger's Lost Loot"	July 21, 2021	0.88
Josh travels the American Midwest tracing the history of legendary outlaw John Dillinger.
9.2	"The Lost Avenger"	July 28, 2021	N/A
Josh joins Project Recover to search for a lost WWII bomber in the waters near California's Channel Islands.
9.3	"Ransom in the Sky"	August 4, 2021	N/A
Josh searches the Pacific Northwest for clues to the mystery of D. B. Cooper.
9.4	"The Quest for El Dorado"	August 11, 2021	1.01
Josh heads to Colombia to investigate the golden treasures and lost cities that inspired the legend of El Dorado.
9.5	"Uncovering the Golden City"	August 18, 2021	N/A
Josh continues his trek in search of lost Tairona cities in the Colombian jungle.
9.6	"America's Titanic"	August 25, 2021	N/A
Josh joins a salvage team off the North Carolina coast to investigate the sunken steamship Pulaski and its hoard of rare coins.

=== Season 10 (2022) ===
No.	Title	Original release date	U.S. viewers (millions)
10.1	"Buried Secrets of Hitler"	May 25, 2022	1.152
Josh joins a team in Poland to explore a WWII Nazi tunnel that may contain stolen artwork.
10.2	"Nazi Buried Secrets"	June 1, 2022	N/A
Josh continues his quest to find Nazi plunder and artifacts hidden in Poland.
10.3	"Outlaw Fortune"	June 8, 2022	N/A
Josh travels to Kansas and Oklahoma to search for the lost treasure of the infamous Dalton Gang.
10.4	"Lindbergh's Lost Rival"	June 15, 2022	N/A
Josh visits Paris, then scours the wilderness of Maine and Newfoundland to find the wreckage of L'Oiseau Blanc (The White Bird), which disappeared in 1927 while competing for the Orteig Prize.
10.5	"Knights Templar Treasure Hunt"	June 22, 2022	N/A
Josh searches England and Poland to unearth the secret world of the Knights Templar, the legendary warriors rumored to have amassed vast riches and treasures, including the coveted Holy Grail.
10.6	"The Bootlegger's Millions"	June 29, 2022	N/A
Josh investigates the buried fortune of Prohibition era mobster Dutch Schultz; he joins divers in the murky waters near a New York mansion where Dutch once lived and explored underground passageways in the bunker that concealed the bootlegger's secret distillery.
10.7	"Escaping the Rock"	July 6, 2022	N/A
Josh heads to Alcatraz in San Francisco to trace the route of three missing convicts from a famous 1962 escape attempt. Then, he searches the jungles of Brazil for evidence that the fugitives might have fled there.
10.8	"Egypt's Lost Tombs"	July 13, 2022	N/A
Egypt's ministry of antiquities invites Josh to join an active dig at Saqqara, where he unearths mummies and treasure buried in 4000-year-old tombs. He examines the pyramid of Merenre and the mummy found within, which could be the oldest known remains of a pharaoh.
10.9	"Egypt's City of the Dead"	July 20, 2022	N/A
Josh visits Luxor, then continues excavating at the Saqqara necropolis, where he uncovers another mummy. He explores the tomb of a high-ranking Old Kingdom official that hints at the societal collapse that led to the First Intermediate Period.
10.10	"Chasing Everglades Treasure"	August 3, 2022	N/A
Josh learns the history of the "King of the Everglades," bank robber and rum-runner John Ashley while searching Florida's swamps for his possible hidden treasure.
10.11	"Mysteries of Moses"	August 10, 2022	N/A
Josh investigates the history of Moses, exploring Egyptian tombs that may relate to his story, visiting Saint Catherine's Monastery at Mount Sinai, and climbing the holy mountain.
10.12	"Chasing the Mysteries of Moses"	August 17, 2022	N/A
Josh continues to follow the legends of Moses, searching for evidence of Semitic languages at Serabit el-Khadim in the Sinai Peninsula. He tours an archaeological dig at Khirbet el-Mastarah in the West Bank, dives into the Sea of Galilee, and visits Nabi Musa which is believed by some to be the tomb of Moses.
10.13	"Donner Party Horror and Heroes"	August 24, 2022	N/A
Josh ventures into the snowy Sierra Nevada mountains near Truckee, California with a group who are re-tracing the path of the ill-fated Donner Party and investigates the heroic story of their rescuers.
10.14	"Finding Italy's Lost Empire"	August 31, 2022	N/A
Josh learns about the ancient Etruscan civilization and its influence on Roman culture as he explores tombs at Tarquinia and Cerveteri.

=== Season 11 (2023) ===
No.	Title	Original release date	U.S. viewers (millions)
11.1	"Sunken Pyramids of The Nile"	May 24, 2023	0.837
Just before the outbreak of the 2023 Sudan conflict, Josh visits Sudan to explore the ancient pyramids of the Nubian Kingdom of Kush. At Nuri, he joins archaeologists in an underwater excavation of the sunken tomb of Nastasen.
11.2	"Mystery of the Flooded Pyramid"	May 31, 2023	1.106
Josh concludes his investigation of Kush as he climbs the holy mountain Jebel Barkal to learn the religious and martial reasons behind the Kushite rule of Egypt. At Nastasen's tomb, divers recover apparent proof of the king's from his sarcophagus.
11.3	"Lost City of the Gospels"	June 7, 2023	0.949
In the Golan Heights, Josh visits archaeological sites claimed to be Bethsaida, the lost settlement which, according to the gospels, was the hometown of three apostles and a place where Jesus performed miracles.
11.4	"Treasure of the Pirate King"	June 14, 2023	0.956
Josh searches the coast of The Lizard in Cornwall for the loot of Henry Avery, who reportedly escaped with the largest treasure in the history of piracy.
11.5	"Great Lakes' Vanished Warships"	June 21, 2023	1.070
Josh dives into Lake Superior in search of the lost WWI French minesweepers Inkerman and Cerisoles, exploring the waters near the Upper Peninsula of Michigan and Michipicoten Island in Canada.
11.6	"Hunt for Spain's King Arthur"	June 28, 2023	N/A
Josh travels to Asturias in Spain to investigate the truth behind the legend of the 8th century King Pelayo. He joins researchers to uncover ceremonial human burials deep in the La Garma cave complex.
11.7	"Looted Treasures of Cambodia"	July 5, 2023	N/A
Josh joins archaeologists at Koh Ker which briefly was the capital of the Khmer Empire. The team uncovers ancient temple carvings and searches for evidence that could help repatriate stolen statues lost through the illicit antiquities trade.
11.8	"Cambodia's Stolen Monuments"	July 12, 2023	N/A
Josh continues his investigation into artifacts looted by former Khmer Rouge soldiers and traded by controversial antiquities dealer Douglas Latchford. He examines possible reasons for the historical fall of Koh Ker, dives for statue fragments in a temple moat, and helps to recover a piece of the pedestal of an iconic statue.

=== Season 12 (2023) ===
No.	Title	Original release date	U.S. viewers (millions)
12.1	"Missing Heroes of WW2"	November 15, 2023	N/A
Josh joins Project Recover at Chuuk Lagoon in Micronesia to search for the remains of missing-in-action servicemen and aircraft from Operation Hailstone.
12.2	"Finding the Lost Pilots of WW2"	November 22, 2023	N/A
Josh concludes his stay at Chuuk Lagoon by visiting underwater sites identified by sonar survey, including a dive to a recently discovered Douglas SBD Dauntless.
12.3	"Lost City of the White Jaguar"	November 29, 2023	N/A
Josh joins an expedition to uncover the Maya lost city of Sac Balam located deep in the Lacandon Jungle of Chiapas, Mexico.
12.4	"Riches of Spain's Pirate King"	December 6, 2023	N/A
Josh's hunt for the pirate king Amaro Pargo's hidden stolen treasure in the Canary Islands leads him beneath an active volcano.
12.5	"Chasing Bonnie and Clyde"	December 13, 2023	N/A
Josh teams up with a former FBI agent looking for information in an East Texas cave used as a hideout that once belonged to the infamous bank robbers Bonnie and Clyde.
12.6	"Sunken Treasure of the Bahamas"	December 20, 2023	N/A
At Little Bahama Bank, Josh joins a salvage team financed by businessman Carl Allen to recover artifacts from the 1656 wreck of the Spanish galleon Nuestra Señora de las Maravillas.
12.7	"Lost Tomb of the Viking King"	December 27, 2023	N/A
Josh traverses Denmark, Sweden, and Poland exploring the legend of King Harald Bluetooth and the lost Viking settlement Jomsborg that may be his final resting place.
12.8	"Hunt for the Secret Seaplane"	January 3, 2024	N/A
Josh joins a salvage team seeking the wreckage of the XP5Y, a prototype U.S. Navy seaplane that crashed off the coast of San Diego, California in 1953.

=== Season 13 (2024) ===
No.	Title	Original release date	U.S. viewers (millions)
13.1	"Hunt for Alexander the Great"	June 19, 2024	N/A
Josh investigates the lost tomb of Alexander the Great, visiting the tomb of Phillip II in Vergina, Greece and an archaeological dig in the middle of modern Alexandria, Egypt.
13.2	"Alexander's Lost Tomb"	June 26, 2024	N/A
Josh continues the search in Alexandria, then visits the British Museum in London and St Mark's Basilica in Venice to pursue one researcher's theory that Alexander's remains might actually lie in the place of Saint Mark's relics.
13.3	"Traitors' Treasure of 1776"	July 3, 2024	N/A
In Pennsylvania, Josh joins researchers who are investigating the hideouts and possible lost fortune of the Doan Outlaws, a Loyalist family of spies and robbers who opposed the Patriots during the American Revolutionary War.
13.4	"Sharks vs. Nazis in Paradise"	July 10, 2024	N/A
Josh joins shark expert Tristan Guttridge in the waters off Key West in an attempt to track sharks to the lost wreck of the Norlindo, a fuel tanker sunk by a German U-boat during Operation Drumbeat. This episode aired as part of Discovery's Shark Week 2024.
13.5	"Lost Bomber of World War II"	July 17, 2024	N/A
Josh meets the restoration team of the Fleet Air Arm Museum searching for parts of Fairey Barracudas, a model of British bombers of which no intact examples exist. He excavates a former airfield in St Andrews, Scotland then finds wreckage near Alta in the far north of Norway, where Barracudas once attacked the Nazi battleship Tirpitz.
13.6	"Chasing Africa's Atlantis"	July 24, 2024	N/A
Josh travels to Zanzibar and Mafia Island in Tanzania in search of Rhapta, a lost city of fortune at the bottom of the ocean that's described as the Atlantis of Africa.
13.7	"America's MIA Heroines"	July 31, 2024	N/A
Josh teams up with Project Recovery again, searching for a Douglas C-47 Skytrain plane that was lost off the coast of Côte d'Ivoire in 1945 while transporting 18 members of the Women's Army Corps (WAC) .

=== Season 14 (2024) ===
No.	Title	Original release date	U.S. viewers (millions)
14.1	"Hunt for Petra's Lost Tombs"	October 9, 2024	N/A
To investigate the ancient Nabataeans, Josh joins a team in Petra, Jordan with permission to excavate in front of its iconic Treasury. Then he travels to the ruins of Sela where a cliffside inscription may explain how the fall of the Kingdom of Edom led to the Nabataeans' rise to power.
14.2	"Petra's Secrets Revealed"	October 16, 2024	N/A
Josh concludes his visit to Petra, joining archaeologists as they open the tomb below the Treasury, finding skeletal remains and artifacts likely dating to the first century BCE. Then Josh visits scientists using computer imaging to reconstruct scrolls that reveal how the Nabataeans influenced later cultures.
14.3	"Search for Pan Am's Clipper"	October 23, 2024	N/A
Josh joins a team off the coast of San Juan, Puerto Rico searching for the wreck of a Douglas DC-4 named Clipper Endeavor, which was involved in a tragic 1952 accident that changed over-water airline safety regulations.
14.4	"America's First Train Robbers"	November 6, 2024	N/A
Josh meets up with treasure hunters in Indiana, on the search for the lost loot of the Reno Gang, a group of 19th century train robbers.
14.5	"Dive for America's Pirate Loot"	November 13, 2024	N/A
Searching for the sunken treasure of "Black Sam" Bellamy, Josh joins a team at the shoals off Cape Cod, Massachusetts who are excavating the Whydah, the only authenticated wreck of a pirate ship from the Golden Age of Piracy ever discovered.
14.6	"'Twas the Search for Saint Nick"	November 20, 2024	N/A
Josh goes in search of the bones of Saint Nicholas, the historical inspiration for Santa Claus. He visits the saint's place of origin in Myra Turkey and locations of his possible remains: Bari and Venice in Italy and even in Chicago.

=== Season 15 (2025) ===
No.	Title	Original release date	U.S. viewers (millions)
15.1	"Hitler's Amerikabomber"	June 18, 2025	N/A
In Poland, Josh inspects evidence of the Nazi Amerikabomber program which intended to build a long-range aircraft to attack the United States. He joins a team searching the tunnels of the Międzyrzecki Rejon Umocniony (MRU) and excavates the possible site of an underground aircraft factory.
15.2	"The Man-Eating Lions of Kenya"	June 25, 2025	N/A
Josh travels to Tsavo, Kenya, visiting the sites of the Tsavo Man-Eaters attacks, where a pair of rogue lions killed numerous people in 1898. He heads into the field with rangers of the Big Life Foundation conservation group as they track aggressive lions responsible for livestock attacks. Then, conservators at Chicago's Field Museum reveal recent discoveries from the scientific study of the man-eating lions' skulls.
15.3	"The Lost Grave of Buffalo Bill"	July 2, 2025	N/A
Josh examines the theory that Western showman Buffalo Bill Cody may have been buried on Cedar Mountain near Cody, Wyoming, rather than the more commonly accepted gravesite on Lookout Mountain in Colorado. Then he joins a treasure hunter searching for a potential buried cache of Buffalo Bill's whiskey.
15.4	"Shipwreck Triangle of Greece"	July 9, 2025	N/A
In the waters near the Greek island Fourni, Josh joins archaeologists investigating a concentration of ancient shipwrecks and recovering amphorae from the sea floor. The team tests a theory that unpredictable winds and currents made one strait particularly treacherous to seafarers.
15.5	"Treasure of the Pirate Queen"	July 16, 2025	N/A
Josh joins treasure hunters in the swamps of South Carolina looking for the lost fortune of the infamous pirate Anne Bonny, whose fate remains unknown. Then they search for the remnants of a potential trading post on the former King's Highway that could relate to Bonny.
15.6	"Searching for World War II's Lost Hero"	July 31, 2025	N/A
Josh again joins the Project Recover team at Chuuk Lagoon, Micronesia to find the lost Republic P-47 Thunderbolt of WWII fighter pilot Gordon Beecroft who went missing in action.
15.7	"Mystery Ruins of the Stone Age"	August 6, 2025	N/A
At Göbekli Tepe in Turkey, Josh examines a Neolithic settlement that holds some of the world's oldest known megalithic structures. At nearby Karahan Tepe, he joins archaeologists who are excavating the ruins of ritual sites.

=== Season 16 (2025) ===
No.	Title	Original release date	U.S. viewers (millions)
16.1	"Mysteries of the Great Pyramid"	November 5, 2025	N/A
With rare private access to the passages inside the Great Pyramid of Giza, Josh tests conspiracy theories about the monument, including the possibility it may hold still undiscovered treasures of Khufu.
16.2	"Great Pyramid Secrets Revealed"	November 12, 2025	N/A
In the conclusion of his exploration of the Great Pyramid, Josh examines records left by its builders, tests a method to move giant limestone blocks, and uses photogrammetry to find potential clues to an undiscovered chamber.
16.3	"The Great Gold Rush Shootout"	November 19, 2025	N/A
Josh searches the mountains near Weaverville, California for gold stolen in 1892 by stagecoach robbers the Ruggles brothers. He is joined by guest Parker Schnabel from Gold Rush.
16.4	"The Nazi's Lost Super Sub"	November 26, 2025	N/A
Traveling from Germany to the Baltic Sea, Josh joins a group searching for the lost experimental German submarine V-80 at the bottom of the sea near Hel, Poland.
16.5	"The Real Goonies Treasure"	December 3, 2025	N/A
Inspired by his favorite movie The Goonies, Josh travels to its filming location Astoria, Oregon and investigates artifacts of the "beeswax wreck", believed to be the 17th century Spanish treasure galleon Santo Cristo de Burgos.
16.6	"Vanderbilt's Lost Steamship"	December 10, 2025	N/A
Josh traces the route of the lost steamship Orus commissioned by Cornelius Vanderbilt to chart a course through Nicaragua's San Juan River, where it wrecked in 1850.

=== Season 17 (2026) ===
No.	Title	Original release date	U.S. viewers (millions)
17.1	"Hunt for the World War II Hellships"	June 24, 2026	N/A
Josh joins a team searching for sunken WWII Japanese "hell ships". Off the coast of Luzon in the Philippines, they discover a wreck that could be the Hōfuku Maru, where over 1,000 Allied prisoners of war died. Then, Josh dives with the Defense POW/MIA Accounting Agency on the USNS Salvor as they dive to the Ōryoku Maru.
17.2	"Finding World War II's Lost Prisoners"	July 1, 2026	N/A
Josh continues his examination of the hell ships, helping the salvage team recover remains of POWs from the Ōryoku Maru. Then, analysis of the wreck off Luzon confirms the discovery of the Hōfuku Maru.
17.3	"Death Jars of Laos"	July 8, 2026	N/A
Josh joins archaeologists who are uncovering the giant stone containers at the Plain of Jars in Laos. They explore the jars' possible purpose and the danger posed by unexploded ordinance left over from the Laotian Civil War.
17.4	"Sunken City of Pirates"	July 15, 2026	N/A
In Jamaica, Josh searches for the wrecks of the legendary pirate "Black Bart" Bartholomew Roberts and takes part in a survey of submerged areas of Port Royal that sank in the 1692 Jamaica earthquake.
17.5	"Secrets of Mexico's Underworld"	July 22, 2026	N/A
Josh visits archaeologists at the remnants of the terrace cities of the ancient Zoque people in Chiapas, Mexico. The group journey into the canyons of the La Venta River to explore caves filled with pottery offerings.
17.6	"Inca Treasure Tunnels"	August 5, 2026	N/A
Josh joins a team searching for chincanas, hidden Inca tunnels under Cusco. His journey takes him on a tour of the Coricancha and Sacsayhuamán, where archaeologists are excavating what they believe are entrances to the tunnels.
17.7	"Chasing Civil War Gold"	August 12, 2026	N/A
Josh joins treasure hunting metal detectorists searching rural Georgia for a hoard of coins from the Confederate treasury transported by Jefferson Davis and rumored to have been stolen and buried.

=== Extra Finds (2016–17) ===
Extra Finds episodes involve viewers interacting with Gates.

No.	Title	Original release date	US viewers (millions)
1	"Extra Finds: Captain Morgan's Lost Gold"	March 30, 2016	N/A
Additional coverage of Josh's attempt to find Captain Morgan's lost gold and sunken flagship.
2	"Extra Finds: Temple of Doom"	April 6, 2016	N/A
Additional coverage of Josh's search for the Linga stones.
3	"Extra Finds: Secrets of the Nazca"	April 13, 2016	N/A
Additional coverage of the Nazca Lines.
4	"Extra Finds: Mayan Apocalypse"	April 20, 2016	N/A
Additional coverage of the season one Mayan Empire episode.
5	"Extra Finds: Amelia Earhart"	April 27, 2016	N/A
6	"Extra Finds: Samurai Sword of Power"	May 4, 2016	N/A
7	"Extra Finds: Code to Gold"	May 11, 2016	N/A
Additional coverage of the Thomas Beale treasure.
8	"Extra Finds: City of Gold"	May 18, 2016	N/A
Additional coverage of the City of Gold.
9	"Extra Finds: Curse of the Golden Bell"	May 25, 2016	N/A
10	"Extra Finds: A Day in the Life"	June 29, 2016	0.62
11	"Extra Finds: Secrets of Shangri-La"	July 6, 2016	0.59
Additional coverage of Shangri-La.
12	"Extra Finds: Viking Sunstone"	July 13, 2016	N/A
13	"Extra Finds: The Legend of Jesse James"	July 20, 2016	0.31
Additional coverage of Jesse James' lost gold.
14	"Extra Finds: World's 8th Wonder"	July 27, 2016	N/A
Additional coverage of the Amber Chamber.
15	"Extra Finds: The Quest for King Arthur"	March 29, 2017	N/A
16	"Extra Finds: The Real Robin Hood"	April 5, 2017	N/A
17	"Extra Finds: True Cross of Christ"	April 12, 2017	N/A
18	"Extra Finds: Blackbeard's Hidden Gold"	April 19, 2017	0.60
19	"Extra Finds: Finding Fenn's Fortune"	April 26, 2017	0.55
20	"Extra Finds: Hunting Vampires"	May 3, 2017	0.58
21	"Extra Finds: The Sultan's Heart"	May 10, 2017	0.53
22	"Extra Finds: Nazi Secrets Revealed"	May 17, 2017	0.56
23	"Extra Finds: Africa's Gold Hoard"	May 24, 2017	0.59
24	"Extra Finds: Lost Mexican City"	July 19, 2017	0.63

=== Hunt for the Yeti (2016) ===
No.	Title	Original release date	US viewers (millions)
1	"Return of the Yeti"	October 5, 2016	0.773
Josh visits Kathmandu and hikes into the Himalayan mountains once again searching for the legendary Yeti.
2	"The Monster and the Mountain"	October 12, 2016	N/A
Josh continues his exploration of the Himalayas and examines sacred artifacts that some Nepalese people believe come from the creature.
3	"Out of Thin Air"	October 19, 2016	N/A
Josh explores the slopes of Mount Everest, then travels to the forests of Bhutan, where he once found an alleged Yeti footprint on Destination Truth.
4	"Unmasking the Myth"	October 26, 2016	N/A
Josh wraps up his rafting trek in Bhutan, then returns to the US where scientists analyze the evidence he collected.

=== Hunt for Extraterrestrials (2017) ===
No.	Title	Original release date	US viewers (millions)
1	"Hunt for Extraterrestrials - Close Encounters"	October 4, 2017	0.76
Josh begins his search for extraterrestrial life with a once-in-a-lifetime visit to NASA and an alien-hunting expedition in Chile, where scientists and ufologists are making new discoveries.
2	"Hunt for Extraterrestrials - Ancient Visitors"	October 11, 2017	0.70
Josh journeys to remote Easter Island, where ancient alien theorists believe extraterrestrials visited a millennium ago; the site of a recent meteorite strike in Zimbabwe could prove life on Earth began in outer space.
3	"Hunt for Extraterrestrials - UFOs Over England"	October 18, 2017	0.80
The hunt for alien life continues in Zimbabwe, where Josh interviews witnesses from Ariel School, one of the largest UFO sightings in modern history. Then he revisits the infamous case that has become known as Europe's Roswell in England.
4	"Hunt for Extraterrestrials - Roswell Revealed"	October 25, 2017	0.71
Josh's epic search for alien life comes to a close in the US, where a legendary investigation team brings him to a hot case in Arkansas. Then, he visits with a researcher who may have new information on the mother of all UFOs.

=== Search for the Afterlife (2018) ===
No.	Title	Original release date	US viewers (millions)
1	"Heaven and Earth"	October 7, 2018	N/A
Seeking evidence of the afterlife, Josh enters an ancient Roman gate to hell that still claims victims; in New York, a medical doctor shows how consciousness survives death; in California, a gifted medium shocks Josh with a message from beyond.
2	"Death and Beyond"	October 14, 2018	N/A
Dr. Deepak Chopra advises Josh to investigate the phenomenon of reincarnation in India; in Turkey, Josh explores an Islamic path to paradise; he returns to face a man possessed by an evil spirit.
3	"Edge of Existence"	October 21, 2018	N/A
From ancient tombs to the latest technology, humans have always been obsessed with cheating death; Josh visits a tribe in Indonesia where people live with mummies; a Russian cryonics laboratory freezes humans for the future.
4	"Crossing Over"	October 28, 2018	N/A
In the Amazon, Josh meets a shaman who takes him on an ayahuasca trip to the brink of the afterlife; a team of investigators guide Josh into one of the most haunted places on Earth.

=== Expedition: Back to the Future (2021) ===
In this four-part Discovery+ miniseries, Josh Gates is joined by Back to the Future star Christopher Lloyd as they journey across the U.S. in search of all surviving DMC DeLorean vehicles which were used in the film trilogy. Their mission is to sell a time machine at auction to benefit The Michael J. Fox Foundation.

No.	Title	Original release date	US viewers (millions)
1	"Josh's Adventure of a Lifetime"	March 15, 2021	N/A
Josh and Christopher Lloyd set off to find all the DeLorean time machines used in the film series.
2	"DeLorean Debacle"	March 15, 2021	N/A
Josh and Christopher Lloyd search out versions of the original time machine held by collectors.
3	"Almost Outta Time"	March 15, 2021	N/A
Josh and Christopher Lloyd examine the DeLoreans at Universal Studios Florida in Orlando, Florida, but they are hit with a new problem.
4	"Great Josh!"	March 15, 2021	N/A
As time runs out, the guys need to construct their own DeLorean time machine.

=== Aftershows ===
After the Hunt is a series of aftershows for Expedition Unknown.

==== Hunt for Extraterrestrials: After the Hunt (2017) ====
No.	Title	Original release date	US viewers (millions)
1	"Hunt for Extraterrestrials - After the Hunt"	October 4, 2017	0.64
2	"Hunt for Extraterrestrials - After the Hunt"	October 11, 2017	0.62
3	"Hunt for Extraterrestrials - After the Hunt"	October 18, 2017	0.66
4	"Hunt for Extraterrestrials - After the Hunt"	October 25, 2017	0.60

==== Expedition Unknown: After the Hunt — Season 6 (2020) ====
Season 6 of After the Hunt, aftershows for season 8 of Expedition Unknown

No.	Title	Original release date	US viewers (millions)
1	"After the Hunt: D-Day Revealed"	February 5, 2020	N/A
2	"After the Hunt: America's Mysteries Uncovered"	February 12, 2020	N/A
3	"After the Hunt: Unknown Ancestors"	February 19, 2020	N/A
4	"After the Hunt: Uncovering Humanity"	February 26, 2020	N/A
5	"After the Hunt: Mysteries Beneath Our Feet"	March 4, 2020	N/A
6	"After the Hunt: Diving Deeper, Looking Higher"	March 11, 2020	N/A
7	"After the Hunt: Uncovering Land and Sea"	March 18, 2020	N/A

=== Shark Week Specials ===
Expedition Unknown special episodes aired during Discovery's Shark Week in 2019, 2021 and 2026. These two specials are not classified as belonging to any season. Additionally, a shark-themed episode "Sharks vs. Nazis in Paradise" aired as part of Shark Week 2024, and is listed as the fourth episode of season 13.

No.	Title	Original release date	US viewers (millions)
1	"Expedition Unknown: Megalodon"	July 28, 2019	1.845
Josh travels across Mexico and South Africa to find fossilized traces of the Megalodon. Joined by shark experts, he goes diving to learn what it might have been like to encounter the ancient giant shark.
2	"Expedition Unknown: Shark Trek"	July 12, 2021	0.94
Josh and William Shatner go on a shark diving adventure in The Bahamas.
3	"Expedition Unknown: Shark Secrets"	July 29, 2026	1.15
Josh investigates the USS Indianapolis, the Stronsay Beast, and prehistoric remains that might be the earliest shark attack on a human.

== Spin-offs ==
Expedition X is a paranormal spin-off of Expedition Unknown which premiered on Discovery in February 2020. The series is hosted by Josh Gates with Phil Torres, Jessica Chobot (seasons 1-7), and Heather Amaro (season 8-).

Josh Gates Tonight is a talk show spin-off that debuted on Discovery in April 2020 in which Gates interviews celebrity guests via videoconference. The series aired as replacement programming during the COVID-19 lockdown period. Its fifth and last season premiered in May 2022.

=== Expedition Files ===
Expedition Files is a documentary television series and spin-off of Expedition Unknown that debuted on Discovery Channel with a preview episode on October 30, 2024, followed by the remainder of the first season beginning on November 27. The series is hosted by Josh Gates from a virtual set, where he narrates re-enactments of unusual historical events, unsolved mysteries, and paranormal phenomena. The second season premiered on April 16, 2025.

==== Season 1 (2024–2025) ====
No.	Title	Original release date	US viewers (millions)
1	"Invisible Enemies"	October 30, 2024	N/A
Josh Gates narrates three stories about unknown culprits: the Travis Walton incident, the Lindbergh kidnapping, and Havana syndrome.
2	"Monsters Unmasked"	November 27, 2024	N/A
Josh presents theories about three mysteries: Jack the Ripper, the Yeti, and the Max Headroom signal hijacking.
3	"Tragic Endings"	December 4, 2024	N/A
Three files about deadly events: the Dyatlov Pass incident, the alleged curse of King Tut's tomb, and the disappearance of Kenny Veach
4	"Lost Civilizations"	December 11, 2024	N/A
Theories about mysterious locations: the lost Roanoke Colony, Sodom and Gomorrah, and Stonehenge.
5	"Code Breakers"	December 18, 2024	N/A
Stories involving encoded messages: the Zodiac Killer, the Fenn treasure, and the Voynich manuscript
6	"Mysterious Relics"	January 1, 2025	N/A
Stories about strange objects: the Shroud of Turin, the spirit photographs of William H. Mumler, and the Georgia Guidestones

==== Season 2 (2025) ====
No.	Title	Original release date	US viewers (millions)
1	"Conspiracy Theories"	April 16, 2025	N/A
Josh Gates presents three conspiracy-related stories: The sinking of the Titanic, the cause of Harry Houdini's death, and the search for Civil War gold in Dents Run, Pennsylvania.
2	"Deadly Adventures"	April 23, 2025	N/A
Three stories of fatal endings: Franklin's lost expedition, the Black Dahlia murder, and Percy Fawcett and the Lost City of Z.
3	"Family Secrets"	April 30, 2025	N/A
Tales of conspiracies surrounding deaths: the serial killer H. H. Holmes, Grand Duchess Anastasia Nikolaevna of Russia, the disappearances of congressmen Hale Boggs and Nick Begich Sr.
4	"Identity Crises"	May 7, 2025	N/A
Josh presents stories of Billy the Kid's rumored survival, the alien abduction story of Betty and Barney Hill, the identity of the Man in the Iron Mask.
5	"Mysterious Phenomena"	May 14, 2025	N/A
Three mysteries and their potential explanations: The Amityville Horror, spontaneous human combustion, the sinking of the H. L. Hunley
6	"Lost and Found"	May 21, 2025	N/A
Stories of missing people and things: D. B. Cooper, Michael Rockefeller, and James Dean's purportedly cursed Porsche 550 Spyder.

==== Season 3 (2025–2026) ====
No.	Title	Original release date	US viewers (millions)
1	"Vanished"	November 5, 2025	N/A
Josh presents stories on the disappearance of Jimmy Hoffa, the search for the Holy Grail, and the suspicious death of Rudolf Diesel.
2	"Madness Explained"	November 12, 2025	N/A
Josh presents new theories that could explain the Salem witch trials, the Rendlesham Forest incident, and the death of Grigori Rasputin.
3	"Time Reveals All"	November 19, 2025	N/A
Three historical mysteries: the Somerton Man, whether the myths of Troy have basis in fact, and the Shakespeare authorship question
4	"Lost Treasures"	December 3, 2025	N/A
Stories about the search for treasure: The Amber Room, Bitcoin buried in Newport landfill, and King Solomon's Mines
5	"Behind the Myth"	December 10, 2025	N/A
New information might rewrite historical myths: Whether George Mallory and Andrew Irvine could have summited Mount Everest first; the murder trial behind the Greenbrier Ghost; evidence of Mata Hari's espionage.
6	"Strange but True"	January 7, 2026	N/A
Three unusual stories from history: the exorcism of Roland Doe that inspired The Exorcist, how Mithridates poisoned a Roman army with mad honey, and con man Christian Gerhartsreiter who masqueraded as "Clark Rockefeller."
7	"Mysterious Endings"	January 14, 2026	N/A
Three stories with unresolved endings: The MKUltra program and the death of Frank Olson, theories surrounding the death of Cleopatra, and the theft of Willem de Kooning's Woman-Ochre which was traced to an unassuming couple.
8	"History Got It Wrong"	January 21, 2026	N/A
Events from the past are reexamined: the cause of the Hindenburg disaster, the veracity of the Patterson–Gimlin film of Bigfoot, and the 6th century Lost Army of Cambyses that vanished in the Egyptian desert.

==== Season 4 (2026) ====
No.	Title	Original release date	US viewers (millions)
1	"Mysteries of American History"	April 1, 2026	N/A
Josh narrates three stories of US history: the unsolved sinking of the USS Scorpion, a theory that John Wilkes Booth survived his reported death, and the truth and myths of Paul Revere's midnight ride.
2	"Deadly Forecast"	April 8, 2026	N/A
Three stories involving extreme weather: the Donner Party, the lost Arctic military base Camp Century, and the infamous ghost ship Mary Celeste.
3	"Fateful Coverups"	April 15, 2026	N/A
Three historical secrets that were later uncovered: WWII's classified Ghost Army, the reason behind the fall of the Knights Templar, and the Mayerling incident that reshaped European history.
4	"Under Pressure"	April 22, 2026	N/A
Examining the historicity of Noah's Ark and flood myths; the investigation of the 2001 anthrax attacks; the unsolved murder of Bugsy Siegel.
5	"Dark Waters"	April 29, 2026	N/A
Underwater mysteries are examined: Scientific evidence behind the Kraken; the tragic history submerged under Lake Lanier; legends of the sunken city Atlantis.
6	"Fact or Fiction?"	May 6, 2026	N/A
The truth and myths are compared: How Vlad the Impaler inspired Dracula; the psychic spies of the Stargate Project; evidence of the real Spartacus.
7	"Truth Vs. Tabloids"	May 13, 2026	N/A
Outrageous claims are examined: A theory that Jim Morrison faked his death; an alleged ningyo mummy is revealed as a Fiji mermaid; investigating Terry Lovelace's story of alien abduction at Devil's Den State Park, Arkansas.
8	"Who Done It?"	May 20, 2026	N/A
Theories around historical deaths: the suspicious death of Meriwether Lewis, the plane crash of U.N. Secretary-General Dag Hammarskjöld, and the disappearance of Judge Crater.
9	"Larger Than Life"	May 27, 2026	N/A
Stories of legendary figures: the unknown fate of the pirate Henry Every, the Harem conspiracy against Ramesses III, and the reality behind the mythical Amazons.
10	"You Don't Know Me"	June 3, 2026	N/A
The "Lady of the Dunes" murder case is solved after decades; the first known copy of the Gospel of Judas is discovered in the Codex Tchacos; DNA analysis reveals whether Kaspar Hauser was a lost prince.
11	"The Supernatural"	June 10, 2026	N/A
Stories behind supernatural claims: the conspiracy around Nikola Tesla's Teleforce, his supposed "death ray" invention; a 17th century Sicilian nun writes a coded letter said to be from the Devil; scientific explanations for the visions of the Pythia, the Oracle of Delphi.
12	"Smoke and Mirrors"	June 17, 2026	N/A
Theories about the death of Edgar Allan Poe, the myth of Juan Ponce de León's search for the Fountain of Youth, and the murder case surrounding doctor Hawley Harvey Crippen.

==== Specials ====
Expedition Files broadcast special episodes as part of Discovery Channel's Shark Week in 2025 and 2026.

No.	Title	Original release date	US viewers (millions)
1	"Shark Files"	July 23, 2025	N/A
Josh presents stories of the Jersey Shore shark attacks of 1916, the 1852 sinking of the HMS Birkenhead, and the Sydney Shark Arm case of 1935. Note: This special also appears under the title "Expedition Files: Blood in the Water".
2	"Shark Secrets"	July 29, 2026	N/A
The sinking of the USS Indianapolis leads to the survivors facing a mass shark attack; theories explore whether the Stronsay Beast was a basking shark carcass; an ancient skeleton from the Tsukumo Shell Mound is the earliest evidence of a shark attack on a human. Note: This special appears under the title "Expedition Unknown: Shark Secrets".

== Production ==
=== Titan submersible incident ===
In May 2021, Gates and camera operator Brian Weed visited OceanGate CEO Stockton Rush to test out the Titan submersible, with plans to eventually film a dive to the Titanic wreck on the Titan for an episode of Expedition Unknown. A planned test dive in the Puget Sound with Gates and Weed onboard had to be scrubbed after multiple technical issues, and on the journey back Gates grew suspicious of Rush's lack of care for basic safety and brushing over the fact that the Titan was neither certified nor had been properly tested at the depths of the Titanic. Feeling it would be unethical to promote Oceangate to potential customers, Gates asked the network to cancel the planned episode, and the Titan later imploded during a dive to the Titanic in 2023, killing Rush and four others. Footage from Gates' visit was shown in the 2025 HBO documentary Implosion: The Titanic Sub Disaster, with contemporary interviews of Gates recalling his concerns.

== Reception ==
=== Awards and nominations ===
Expedition Unknown won an Emmy for Outstanding Travel and Adventure Program at the 52nd Daytime Emmy Awards on October 17, 2025. This was the first year the category existed, having split from the previous category of Outstanding Travel, Adventure and Nature Program.

Expedition Unknown tied to win an Emmy for Best Writing for a Non-Fiction Series at the 53rd Daytime Emmy Awards in 2026 for the episode "Hunting for World War II's Lost Hero", tied with Joseph Rosendo's Steppin' Out for Cuba.
