= Josh Gates Tonight =

American reality television series

- Presented by: Josh Gates
- Country of origin: United States
- Original language: English
- No. of seasons: 5
- No. of episodes: 58

Production
- Running time: 10-42 minutes
- Production company: Ping Pong Productions

Original release
- Network: Discovery Channel
- Release: April 1, 2020 – June 29, 2022

Josh Gates Tonight is an American talk show starring Josh Gates on the Discovery Channel. It is a spinoff of Gates' series Expedition Unknown originally created as replacement programming in 2020 due to the COVID-19 lockdown period. The program features Gates interviewing celebrity guests via videoconference, with most episodes also including a cocktail recipe, a segment recorded in the field, and comedy bits.

Shorter episodes aired starting on April 1, 2020 and were followed by the full episode premiere on April 22. Initially considered part of Expedition Unknown, Josh Gates Tonight later was classified as a separate series. The fifth and last season premiered on May 25, 2022.

== Production ==
In 2020, pandemic-related travel restrictions halted the production of most Discovery programming, including Josh Gates' series Expedition Unknown. The network asked Gates to produce a show from a "safer at home" environment. Gates stated that the network "...were so desperate that they said, 'You can film it on your iPhone if you want.'" The talk show initially was recorded in a spare bedroom in Gates' home with interviews conducted over Zoom. Production moved to the "Expedition Headquarters" studio starting with episode 14 of the first season.

== Episodes ==
=== Season 1 (2020) ===
No.	Title	Original release date	US viewers (millions)
1	"Josh Gates Tonight: Safer at Home"	April 1, 2020	N/A
While remaining safe at home, Josh interviews Damien Duffy, host of the Discovery series Legends of the Wild. Note: The first three episodes of the series are 10 minutes in duration.
2	"Josh Gates Tonight: Along For The Ride"	April 8, 2020	N/A
Josh recaps his woolly mammoth expedition and tests his videoconferencing skills with the hosts of Legends of the Wild.
3	"Josh Gates Tonight: Digging In"	April 15, 2020	N/A
Josh shares updates and footage from his adventures hunting the mysterious mountain-dwelling yeti; TV personality Dave Turin (Gold Rush: Dave Turin's Lost Mine) joins in to discuss his season finale and winter challenges.
4	"Josh Gates Tonight: Earth Day"	April 22, 2020	N/A
In this Earth Day special, Josh welcomes Joel McHale, talks environmentalism with various stars of Discovery networks shows, and discusses Team Trees with Mark Rober. Note: From this episode forward, the series expands to one hour, including commercials.
5	"Josh Gates Tonight: Exploration Home Office"	April 29, 2020	N/A
Josh is joined by TV personalities Jack Osbourne (Portals to Hell), Sig Hansen (Deadliest Catch), YouTube blacksmith The Hacksmith, and Richard Wiese (president of The Explorers Club). Josh tries to learn the art of axe throwing in his backyard.
6	"Josh Gates Tonight: Stayin' Inside"	May 6, 2020	N/A
Josh interviews Olympic gymnast Shawn Johnson East and discusses stolen art with The Monuments Men author Robert M. Edsel. Josh hosts a virtual summit of "explorer" TV hosts including Josh Bernstein, Jeff Corwin, and Don Wildman.
7	"Josh Gates Tonight: Indiana Josh"	May 13, 2020	N/A
In this Indiana Jones special, Josh interviews actors Karen Allen and John Rhys-Davies (Raiders of the Lost Ark), Adam Savage shows off his Indy props, and Reza Aslan discusses the history of Jesus. Josh learns how to crack a bullwhip in his backyard.
8	"Josh Gates Tonight: Unexplained and Unexplored"	May 20, 2020	N/A
Josh discusses the Bermuda Triangle and welcomes guests Bruce Campbell, Michael Emerson, Mike Baker (Black Files Declassified), and Gwen Grimes (Naked and Afraid XL). Josh has a very short expedition to the "Beverly Hills Bermuda Triangle" an L.A. intersection that's rumored to be cursed.
9	"Josh Gates Tonight: The Merry Adventures of Josh Gates"	May 27, 2020	N/A
Josh explores British legends with Terry Gilliam (Monty Python), Cary Elwes, Jeremy Wade (River Monsters), and Oberon Zell-Ravenheart from the Grey School of Wizardry. Josh forges a sword with Hollywood blacksmith Tony Swatton.
10	"Josh Gates Tonight: GI Josh"	June 3, 2020	N/A
Josh looks back at WWII history with Dennis Quaid, Project Recover, retired SEAL Team Six member Will Chesney, and Flula Borg. Mixologist Jeff "Beachbum" Berry explains the WWII origin of the suffering bastard cocktail. Josh acts as an attack dummy for military dog training.
11	"Josh Gates Tonight: Wild Wild Josh"	June 17, 2020	N/A
Josh chats about the wild west with Louie Anderson, Lou Diamond Phillips, Stephen Root, and Marty Raney from Homestead Rescue. Josh tries to learn shooting and lasso tricks.
12	"Josh Gates Tonight: Show Me the Mummy"	June 24, 2020.	N/A
Josh talks ancient Egypt and interviews Steven Soderbergh, Lucy Lawless, Padma Lakshmi, Patricia Velásquez, and archaeologist Sarah Parcak.
13	"Josh Gates Tonight: Mother Russia"	July 1, 2020	N/A
Josh revisits his Siberian expeditions and talks to actors Scott Glenn, Jason Isaacs, and Danny Trejo, as well as TV hosts Phil Keoghan and Mike Rowe. Josh learns the art of ice sculpture and visits a vodka distillery.
14	"Josh Gates Tonight: Gold Digging Josh"	July 8, 2020	N/A
Josh virtually discusses secret codes and treasures with Jesse Eisenberg, Penn & Teller, Kyle MacLachlan, and former CIA agent Amaryllis Fox. Josh tries to learn lock picking. Note: Starting with this episode, production of the show moves from Josh Gates' house to the "Expedition HQ" studio.
15	"Josh Gates Tonight: Back From Outer Space"	July 15, 2020	N/A
Josh pays tribute to his favorite science fiction with Anthony Daniels, Jonathan Frakes, Marina Sirtis, Lance Henriksen, and Keith David. Special effects makeup artist Jim Ojala transforms Josh into an alien.
16	"Josh Gates Tonight: Like, Totally Josh"	July 22, 2020	N/A
Josh celebrates 1980s pop culture with actors Lea Thompson (Back to the Future), Alex Winter (Bill and Ted's Excellent Adventure), and Sean Astin (The Goonies) and looks to pry clues to The Secret from illustrator John Jude Palencar. Josh asks his kid's karate instructor to teach him the crane kick from The Karate Kid.
17	"Josh Gates Tonight: Game, Set, Josh"	August 20, 2020	N/A
It's game night as Josh interviews guests Neil deGrasse Tyson, John Smoltz, Gary Cole, and Ben Bailey from Cash Cab. Josh tries to run the course from Dodgeball Thunderdome, a show which aired on Discovery at the time.
18	"Josh Gates Tonight: Alive"	August 27, 2020	N/A
Josh discusses survival with David Arquette (You Cannot Kill David Arquette), Josh Lucas (Alive), and the hosts of the Discovery show 100 Days Wild. Josh goes survivalist shopping at a military surplus store.
19	"Josh Gates Tonight: No Fear of Heists"	September 2, 2020	N/A
Josh explores heists with Elliott Gould (Ocean's Eleven), Kevin Pollak (The Usual Suspects), Luis Guzmán, and hostage negotiator Christopher Voss. Josh learns getaway car driving from a Hollywood stunt driver.
20	"Josh Gates Tonight: Josh's Monster Mash"	September 9, 2020	N/A
Josh explores cinematic gods and monsters with the actors Orlando Jones, Sarah Wayne Callies, and Doug Jones. Josh tours the collection of movie memorabilia dealer Joe Maddalena.
21	"Josh Gates Tonight: A Spot of Josh"	September 16, 2020	N/A
Josh goes on a virtual Anglophile adventure interviewing John Cleese, Lucy Davis, Cat Deeley, and Ed Stafford. Josh visits the Will Rogers Polo Club.
22	"Josh Gates Tonight: Sherlock Josh"	September 23, 2020	N/A
Josh investigates life's mysteries with actor Matthew Modine, author Deepak Chopra, Chazz Palminteri, and Arthur Brand. Josh hires a private detective to tail his writer, comedian Tony Sam.
23	"Josh Gates Tonight: King Me!"	September 30, 2020	N/A
Josh celebrates the works of Stephen King with guests Anthony Michael Hall (The Dead Zone), Dee Wallace (Cujo), David Morse (The Green Mile), and Danny Lloyd (The Shining). Josh and his cameraman Evan B. Stone visit a socially-distanced drive-through Halloween haunted attraction.

=== Josh Gates Tonight: Shark Week (2020) ===
In August 2020, Josh Gates Tonight aired daily during Discovery's Shark Week with shark-related episodes.

No.	Title	Original release date	US viewers (millions)
SW1	"Josh Gates Tonight: Shark Week"	August 9, 2020	N/A
SW2	"Josh Gates Tonight: Shark Week: Totally Jaw-Some"	August 10, 2020	N/A
SW3	"Josh Gates Tonight: Shark Week: Some-Fin Special"	August 11, 2020	N/A
SW4	"Josh Gates Tonight: Shark Week: The Gill Of It All"	August 12, 2020	N/A
SW5	"Josh Gates Tonight: Shark Week: Are We Having Fin Yet?"	August 13, 2020	N/A

=== Season 2 (2020) ===
A second season of seven episodes premiered in November 2020.

No.	Title	Original release date	US viewers (millions)
1	"The Gates Files"	November 11, 2020	N/A
Josh discusses the paranormal with guests Matthew McConaughey and Dean Haglund. Josh joins Phil Torres & Jessica Chobot of Expedition X in Wisconsin for a behind-the-scenes look at the production of season 3.
2	"By Land, Sea, or Zoom"	November 18, 2020	N/A
Josh discusses exploration with guests John Lithgow, explorer Ranulph Fiennes, and astronauts Bob Behnken and Doug Hurley. Josh gets a demonstration in urban mushing with a team of sled dogs.
3	"Happy Joshgiving"	November 25, 2020	N/A
Josh discusses Thanksgiving with guests Guy Fieri, Cheryl Hines, and Alfonso Ribeiro. Josh visits a pumpkin patch and gets lost in a corn maze.
4	"Super Josh"	December 2, 2020	N/A
Josh discusses superheroes with Katee Sackhoff, Joe Manganiello, and Famke Janssen. Josh tours the set of BattleBots.
5	"Josh Spaces Out"	December 9, 2020	N/A
Josh talks space exploration with guests astronaut Charles Duke, Mayim Bialik, Tim Heidecker, and Keir Dullea. Josh experiences weightlessness on a reduced-gravity aircraft.
6	"Merry Josh-Mas"	December 16, 2020	N/A
Josh celebrates Christmas films with guests Peter Billingsley, Judy Greer, and Reginald VelJohnson. Josh takes a festive tour of SkyPark at Santa's Village.
7	"Full Stream Ahead"	December 23, 2020	N/A
Josh promotes Discovery+ with the stars of the streaming service's programs, including David Schwimmer who narrates the nature docuseries Mysterious Planet.

=== Season 3 (2021) ===
The third season premiered in April 2021.

No.	Title	Original release date	US viewers (millions)
1	"Josh to the Future"	April 14, 2021	N/A
Josh pays tribute to Back to the Future with Christopher Lloyd, Craig Robinson, and Tiffany Beers the designer of the Nike Mag self-tying shoes. Josh visits the Time Travel Mart operated by 826LA.
2	"Heeeeere's...Joshy!"	April 21, 2021	N/A
Josh talks horror movies with guests Robert Englund, Seth Green, Joe Dante, and the Expedition X team. Josh learns to drive a monster truck.
3	"The Great Joshdini"	April 28, 2021	N/A
Josh explores magic with guests Dominic Monaghan, Billy Boyd, Michael Carbonaro, and Piff the Magic Dragon.
4	"Ghostly Gates"	May 5, 2021	N/A
Josh discusses ghosts with guests Kevin Bacon, Haley Joel Osment, and the cast of Ghost Brothers. Josh and Jack Osbourne go ghost hunting in LA's Million Dollar Theatre.
5	"Driving Mr. Gates"	May 12, 2021	N/A
Josh talks cars with Larry the Cable Guy, Gabriel Iglesias, Kurt Busch, and the cast of Street Outlaws. Josh learns how to drive a racecar at Willow Springs International Motorsports Park.
6	"It Takes A Villain"	May 19, 2021	N/A
Josh pays tribute to pop culture villains with guests Giancarlo Esposito, Paul Reiser, and Michelle Gomez. Josh visits a stunt performer training school.

=== Josh Gates Tonight: Shark Week (2021) ===
No.	Title	Original release date	US viewers (millions)
1	"Some-Fin New"	July 11, 2021	N/A
Josh chats with Shark Week guest hosts Steve-O & Sean "Poopies" McInerney from Jackass, Tiffany Haddish, and Dickie Chivell. Josh swims with the sharks at Shark Reef at Mandalay Bay.
2	"Acting Chummy"	July 12, 2021	N/A
Josh interviews William Shatner, Brad Paisley, and Robert Irwin from Crikey! It's the Irwins.
3	"Now You Sea Me"	July 13, 2021	N/A
Josh welcomes J. B. Smoove, Kevin Smith, and shark experts Alison Towner and Riley Elliott.
4	"Diving In"	July 14, 2021	N/A
Josh talks with "Dr. Pimple Popper" Sandra Lee, Rob Gronkowski, Shark Week filmmakers Lauren and Joe Romeiro, and the fans behind a community-driven Jaws remake.
5	"Not Feeling Salty"	July 15, 2021	N/A
Josh interviews David Blaine, Kevin O'Leary from Shark Tank, and shark expert Tristan Guttridge. Josh dives with sharks at a shipwreck in The Bahamas.

=== Season 4 (2021) ===
No.	Title	Original release date	US viewers (millions)
1	"Gates to the Unknown"	August 11, 2021	N/A
In an episode about lost cities, Josh interviews Tom Green, Rhys Darby, and BD Wong. He speaks to Jess Phoenix and Stel Pavlou about their Discovery show Hunting Atlantis. Josh visits Lost Spirits, a themed distillery in Las Vegas.
2	"How I Met Your Josh"	August 18, 2021	0.65
Josh welcomes sitcom stars Harry Shearer, Kelsey Grammer, and Susie Essman. Ted Lange (Isaac from The Love Boat) stops by to make his signature cocktail. Josh and Susan Olsen hit the road on a Brady Bunch outing.
3	"20,000 Gates Under The Sea"	August 25, 2021	N/A
Josh recounts maritime mysteries with actor Tim Robbins, Billy Zane, William Fichtner, and Carl Gottlieb the screenwriter of Jaws. Josh dives to the shipwreck of the Star of Scotland in Santa Monica Bay.
4	"I Am (Urban) Legend"	September 1, 2021	N/A
Josh chats about urban legends with JoBeth Williams, Kane Hodder, and the Expedition X team of Jessica Chobot and Phil Torres. Josh attends a séance.
5	"Josh Mobs Up"	September 8, 2021	N/A
In this mobster-themed episode, Josh chats with actors Paul Sorvino, Michael Imperioli, Steve Schirripa, and Vincent D'Onofrio. Josh visits the Mob Museum in Las Vegas.
6	"Building A Better Gatestrap"	September 15, 2021	N/A
Josh pays tribute to inventions and interviews Terrence Howard, Brent Spiner, Dan Harmon, and Aaron Krause the inventor of Scrub Daddy. Josh steps into a flight simulator cockpit.

=== Season 5 (2022) ===
No.	Title	Original release date	US viewers (millions)
1	"Gates Goes Underground"	May 25, 2022	N/A
Josh chats about subterranean locations and interviews guests Evangeline Lilly, Joe Pantoliano, and the Expedition X team.
2	"The Great Gates Robbery"	June 1, 2022	N/A
Josh discusses art theft and interviews guests Parker Posey, Robert M. Edsel author of Monuments Men, and Dan Fogler. Josh and Jess Chobot try out an art heist themed escape room.
3	"The Outlaw Joshy Gates"	June 8, 2022	N/A
Josh talks about legendary outlaws with actors Anson Mount, Troy Kotsur, and Tom Blyth. Josh tries his hand at mounted shooting.
4	"Gates on a Plane"	June 15, 2022	N/A
In this aviation-themed episode, Josh chats with LeVar Burton, Parker Schnabel from Gold Rush, and Steven Weber. Josh takes a ride on an acrobatic plane.
5	"Behind Closed Gates"	June 22, 2022	N/A
Josh delves into secret societies and interviews guests Austin Butler, Mark Proksch, and Love In The Jungle contestant Dishon Isaac. Josh meets up with mentalists at the Magic Castle.
6	"The Gate-teenth Amendment"	June 29, 2022	N/A
Josh discusses the prohibition era and interviews guests Baz Luhrmann, Joe Mantegna, and Danica Patrick. Josh has a lesson in flair bartending.

== Reception ==
Writing for Collider, Robert Brian Taylor recommended the talk show to fans of genre cinema due to Gates' enthusiasm for interviewing guests from classic action, adventure, and horror films. Taylor also positively noted the program's "shaggy, makeshift quality" due to its pandemic origins and its goofy sense of humor.
