= Expedition X =

- Genre: Paranormal; Reality
- Starring: Josh Gates; Jessica Chobot; Phil Torres; Heather Amaro
- Country of origin: United States
- Original language: English
- No. of seasons: 12
- No. of episodes: 94

Production
- Executive producers: Casey Brumels; Josh Gates; Brad Kuhlman
- Cinematography: Danny Long; Brian C. Weed
- Editors: Alpesh Patel; Dustin Peterson
- Running time: 42 minutes
- Production company: Ping Pong Productions

Original release
- Network: Discovery Channel
- Release: February 12, 2020 – present

Related
- Expedition Unknown; Josh Gates Tonight

Expedition X is an American paranormal reality series which premiered on Discovery Channel on February 12, 2020 as a spinoff of Expedition Unknown. Unlike its parent series, Expedition X focuses on paranormal investigations and is hosted by Josh Gates, Phil Torres, Jessica Chobot (seasons 1–7), and Heather Amaro (seasons 8–present).

The second season premiered on November 11, 2020. The twelfth season premiered on August 19, 2026.

== Overview ==
In the series, Josh Gates presents eyewitness accounts or legends of paranormal phenomena such as cryptids, hauntings or UFO sightings. The field team then travels to the site, interviews locals, and conducts a paranormal investigation. The team consists of:

- Jessica Chobot (seasons 1–7), television personality and paranormal investigator
- Phil Torres (seasons 1–present), field biologist
- Heather Amaro (seasons 8–present), paranormal investigator.

While Gates hosts the program from the Expedition HQ studio, he does not typically accompany the team in the field, with the exceptions of the two-part episodes that opened seasons three, six, eight, and ten.

== Episodes ==
=== Series overview ===
| Season | Episodes | Originally released | |
| Season | Episodes | First released | Last released |
|---|---|---|---|
| 1 | 7 | February 12, 2020 | March 25, 2020 |
| 2 | 6 | November 11, 2020 | December 16, 2020 |
| 3 | 7 | April 14, 2021 | May 26, 2021 |
| 4 | 6 | September 1, 2021 | October 6, 2021 |
| 5 | 7 | May 25, 2022 | July 6, 2022 |
| 6 | 8 | August 2, 2023 | September 20, 2023 |
| 7 | 8 | February 7, 2024 | March 27, 2024 |
| 8 | 8 | August 14, 2024 | October 2, 2024 |
| 9 | 9 | January 22, 2025 | March 19, 2025 |
| 10 | 10 | August 20, 2025 | October 22, 2025 |
| 11 | 10 | January 7, 2026 | March 11, 2026 |
| 12 | TBA | August 19, 2026 | TBA |
| Specials | 2 | July 23, 2025 | |

=== Season 1 (2020) ===
| No. | Title | Original release date | U.S. viewers (millions) |
|---|---|---|---|
| 1 | "Mothman Phenomenon" | February 12, 2020 | N/A |
Phil and Jess travel to Point Pleasant, West Virginia in search of Mothman.
| 2 | "Cambodia's Jungle Monster" | February 19, 2020 | N/A |
Phil and Jess investigate the tek tek, a Cambodian Bigfoot-like creature.
| 3 | "Terror on Doll Island" | February 26, 2020 | N/A |
The team visits the infamous Island of the Dolls in Mexico City.
| 4 | "Mystery In Mammoth Cave" | March 11, 2020 | N/A |
The team searches for ghostly phenomena at Mammoth Cave National Park.
| 5 | "Mt. Adams UFO Encounter" | March 11, 2020 | N/A |
The team visits the site of the Kenneth Arnold UFO sighting.
| 6 | "The Amazon's Cursed Ruins" | March 18, 2020 | N/A |
The Expedition X team heads up the Rio Negro river in the Amazon to investigate a haunted outpost.
| 7 | "Lake of the Dead" | March 25, 2020 | N/A |
The team dives into Lake Lanier, the so-called "world's most haunted lake."

=== Season 2 (2020) ===
| No. | Title | Original release date | U.S. viewers (millions) |
|---|---|---|---|
| 1 | "Curse of the Old West Outlaw" | November 11, 2020 | N/A |
Phil and Jess investigate tales of curses and ghosts in Nevada City, Montana.
| 2 | "Round-Up at Death Ranch" | November 18, 2020 | N/A |
The team examines reports of cattle mutilations in the Pacific Northwest.
| 3 | "Terror of the Bell Witch" | November 25, 2020 | N/A |
Phil and Jess delve into the legend of the Bell Witch in Tennessee.
| 4 | "Ghosts in the Swamp" | December 2, 2020 | N/A |
The team investigates the mystery of the Light of Saratoga in the Big Thicket of Texas.
| 5 | "Devil in the Forest" | December 9, 2020 | N/A |
The X team heads to New Jersey to search for the Jersey Devil.
| 6 | "America's Lake Monster" | December 16, 2020 | N/A |
The team dives into Lake Champlain looking for the legendary Champ.

=== Season 3 (2021) ===
| No. | Title | Original release date | U.S. viewers (millions) |
|---|---|---|---|
| 1 | "An American Werewolf" | April 14, 2021 | N/A |
Josh joins Jess and Phil in the field as they search for the Beast of Bray Road.
| 2 | "The Beast of Bray Road" | April 21, 2021 | N/A |
Josh and the team continue their search for a legendary werewolf in rural Wisconsin.
| 3 | "UFOs Over New Mexico" | April 28, 2021 | N/A |
Phil and Jess head to Socorro, New Mexico the site of the Lonnie Zamora incident.
| 4 | "Ghosts in the Canal" | May 5, 2021 | N/A |
The team investigates legends of hauntings on the Chesapeake and Ohio Canal.
| 5 | "Canyon of the Apes" | May 12, 2021 | N/A |
Phil and Jess travel to Ape Canyon at Mount St. Helens in search of Bigfoot.
| 6 | "Aliens of the Deep" | May 19, 2021 | N/A |
The Expedition X team dive into the waters off Catalina Island to investigate unidentified objects as seen in the Pentagon UFO videos.
| 7 | "Into the Alien Ocean" | May 26, 2021 | N/A |
The team are joined by Luis Elizondo as they continue to search the waters off Catalina, where they witness unexplained lights.

=== Season 4 (2021) ===
| No. | Title | Original release date | U.S. viewers (millions) |
|---|---|---|---|
| 1 | "Terror in Appalachia" | September 1, 2021 | N/A |
Hikers are going missing amid reports of grotesque, human-like creatures prowling Appalachia's great smoky mountains. Phil and Jess ventures into the unforgiving wilderness to investigate the truth behind terrifying sightings of feral people.
| 2 | "The Van Meter Monster" | September 8, 2021 | N/A |
Horrified locals in southern Iowa are reporting sightings of a giant winged creature. The same mysterious beast that terrorized the town of Van Meter 100 years ago. Phil and Jess are on a mission to unearth clues to what's lurking in the shadows.
| 3 | "Thailand's UFO Cult" | September 15, 2021 | N/A |
Phil and Jess investigate the Kaokala UFO cult in Bangkok that claims to receive predictions of future natural disasters.
| 4 | "Graveyard of the Great Lakes" | September 22, 2021 | N/A |
The team heads to Whitefish Point on Lake Superior's Shipwreck Coast to investigate reported ghost lights.
| 5 | "Ghost Fort of the Civil War" | September 29, 2021 | N/A |
The team investigates reports of ghostly phenomena at the historic Fort Morgan in Alabama.
| 6 | "Civil War Ghosts in the Bay" | October 6, 2021 | N/A |
Jess and Phil continue their investigation at Fort Morgan joined by Amy Bruni and Adam Berry from Kindred Spirits.

=== Season 5 (2022) ===
| No. | Title | Original release date | U.S. viewers (millions) |
|---|---|---|---|
| 1 | "Ring of Fire UFOs" | May 25, 2022 | N/A |
Jess and Phil investigate unidentified lights seen above the Mexican volcano Popocatépetl.
| 2 | "The Ozark Howler" | June 1, 2022 | N/A |
The team searches for the Ozark Howler, a legendary beast reportedly sighted in Arkansas.
| 3 | "Mexico's Haunted Cenotes" | June 8, 2022 | N/A |
The team investigates paranormal activity in the cenotes of the Yucatán Peninsula.
| 4 | "Avalanche Ghost Train" | June 15, 2022 | N/A |
The team investigates a reported haunting at the site of the 1910 Wellington, Washington avalanche disaster that killed ninety-six people.
| 5 | "Alaskan Lake Monster" | June 22, 2022 | N/A |
The team search whitewater rapids and Alaska's Iliamna Lake for a legendary beast that's now the target of serious scientific inquiry.
| 6 | "Monster of the Amazon" | June 29, 2022 | N/A |
Deep in the Peruvian jungle, Phil tracks what could be an unknown species, while Jess hunts for evidence of a legendary creature known as Yacumama.
| 7 | "Beast of Andros Island" | July 6, 2022 | N/A |
Phil and Jess travel to Andros, Bahamas to dive into its blue holes to find the creatures that may have inspired the mythical sea monster known as the Lusca.

=== Season 6 (2023) ===
| No. | Title | Original release date | U.S. viewers (millions) |
|---|---|---|---|
| 1 | "Ghosts of Eloise Asylum, Part 1" | August 2, 2023 | N/A |
Josh joins Jess and Phil in the field to hunt for evidence of ghosts at Eloise Psychiatric Hospital in Michigan.
| 2 | "Ghosts of Eloise Asylum, Part 2" | August 9, 2023 | N/A |
Josh, Jess, and Phil conclude their investigation at Eloise.
| 3 | "Beast of the Bayou" | August 16, 2023 | N/A |
Jess and Phil investigate stories of the Honey Island Swamp monster in the bayou near New Orleans.
| 4 | "Witches of Mexico" | August 23, 2023 | N/A |
Phil and Jess travel to Monterrey, Mexico to examine tales of brujas, practitioners of witchcraft.
| 5 | "Ghost Town" | August 30, 2023 | N/A |
Phil and Jess look for ghosts at Cerro Gordo, California the abandoned silver mining town owned by entrepreneur and social media personality Brent Underwood.
| 6 | "Hellfire Club" | September 6, 2023 | N/A |
Phil and Jess investigate sites in Dublin and at the Hellfire Caves in West Wycombe for paranormal activity said to be connected to the historical Hellfire Club.
| 7 | "Skinwalker Valley" | September 13, 2023 | N/A |
Phil and Jess visit the Uinta Basin in Utah, where witnesses have reported skin-walkers and UFOs.
| 8 | "Valley of UFOs" | September 20, 2023 | N/A |
The team continue their examination of Uinta Basin, focusing on the area's UFO sightings.

=== Season 7 (2024) ===
| No. | Title | Original release date | U.S. viewers (millions) |
|---|---|---|---|
| 1 | "Transylvanian Terror" | February 7, 2024 | N/A |
Jess and Phil explore the Hoia Baciu Forest in Romania, the site of Josh's most memorable paranormal experience which occurred during the production of a 2009 episode of Destination Truth ("Haunted Forest/Alux").
| 2 | "Killer Sasquatch" | February 14, 2024 | N/A |
The team visits the forests of Alaska's Kenai Peninsula to investigate legends of an aggressive sasquatch.
| 3 | "Death Island" | February 21, 2024 | N/A |
The team arrives on Mackinac Island, Michigan after the summer tourist season to investigate reported paranormal activity at a hotel.
| 4 | "Secrets of Mackinac" | February 28, 2024 | N/A |
As the team continues to explore Mackinac, they are joined by paranormal investigators the Ghost Brothers (Dalen Spratt, Juwan Mass, and Marcus Harvey).
| 5 | "Ghosts of WW2" | March 6, 2024 | N/A |
Phil and Jess search the caves of Okinawa, Japan following reports of hauntings tied to WWII deaths.
| 6 | "Beasts of Britain" | March 13, 2024 | N/A |
Jess and Phil head to the Peak District of England after recent sightings of British big cats.
| 7 | "Niagara Nightmare" | March 20, 2024 | N/A |
The team looks into hauntings reported in the vicinity of Niagara Falls and learns about the history of deaths near the landmark.
| 8 | "Nuclear UFOs" | March 27, 2024 | N/A |
Jess and Phil explore abandoned areas of Fukushima, Japan to investigate UFO sightings that followed the 2011 nuclear accident. The team witnesses unidentified objects above Senganmori mountain in Iino, a small town with a reputation as an extraterrestrial hotspot.

=== Season 8 (2024) ===
| No. | Title | Original release date | U.S. viewers (millions) |
|---|---|---|---|
| 1 | "The Madhouse" | August 14, 2024 | N/A |
Josh joins Phil Torres and new co-host Heather Amaro in the field to investigate paranormal sightings at the Trans-Allegheny Lunatic Asylum in West Virginia.
| 2 | "Trapped in the Asylum" | August 21, 2024 | N/A |
Josh, Phil, and Heather continue their exploration of the reportedly haunted hospital.
| 3 | "What Lurks in Loch Ness" | August 28, 2024 | N/A |
In Scotland, Phil and Heather search for evidence of the Loch Ness Monster. Actor and cryptid enthusiast Rhys Darby makes an appearance to discuss the legendary beast.
| 4 | "Haunted Savannah" | September 4, 2024 | N/A |
Heather and Phil set up a ghost investigation at the Sorrel–Weed House, which is claimed to be one of the most haunted locations in Savannah, Georgia.
| 5 | "City of Ghosts" | September 11, 2024 | N/A |
Heather and Phil continue exploring areas in and near Savannah including The Savannah Theatre and Ebenezer Creek, the location of a Civil War tragedy.
| 6 | "Beast of the Everglades" | September 18, 2024 | N/A |
Heather and Phil head into the swamps of Florida to investigate the legendary skunk ape.
| 7 | "Castle of Terror" | September 25, 2024 | N/A |
Phil and Heather set up a paranormal investigation at Chillingham Castle, a location with a dark history of violence that is claimed to be one of the most haunted castles in England .
| 8 | "The Dogman Conspiracy" | October 2, 2024 | N/A |
Phil and Heather look into claims that the Michigan Dogman could be linked to a military conspiracy.

=== Season 9 (2025) ===
| No. | Title | Original release date | U.S. viewers (millions) |
|---|---|---|---|
| 1 | "Chateau of Horror" | January 22, 2025 | N/A |
Josh sends Phil and Heather to investigate paranormal claims of hostile ghosts linked to past murders at Chateau de Veauce, the most haunted chateau in France.
| 2 | "Beast of Boggy Creek" | January 28, 2025 | N/A |
Phil and Heather travel to Fouke, Arkansas to investigate reports of the Fouke Monster which has been terrorising residents for over a century.
| 3 | "Secrets of the Nazi Occult" | February 5, 2025 | N/A |
In the Czech Republic, Phil and Heather investigate Houska Castle, reportedly the site of Nazi occult experiments.
| 4 | "Nazi Occult Underworld Revealed" | February 12, 2025 | N/A |
Phil and Heather move their investigation of Nazi occult history into Poland, where they visit Książ Castle and the tunnels of Project Riese.
| 5 | "Werewolves of France" | February 19, 2025 | N/A |
In France, the team explores the history of the Beast of Gévaudan and modern reports of an unknown beast or werewolf.
| 6 | "Ghosts of the Mayan Ruins" | February 26, 2025 | N/A |
In Belize, Heather and Phil conduct a paranormal investigation in the ancient Mayan ruins of Xunantunich.
| 7 | "Descent Into the Mayan Underworld" | March 5, 2025 | N/A |
Heather and Phil continue their travels in Belize, entering a cave system associated with Xibalba, the Mayan underworld.
| 8 | "A 'Squatch Above the Rest" | March 12, 2025 | N/A |
Heather and Phil search for sasquatches in Kentucky.
| 9 | "Terror Behind Bars" | March 19, 2025 | N/A |
Heather and Phil investigate paranormal reports at Brushy Mountain State Penitentiary in Tennessee.

=== Season 10 (2025) ===
| No. | Title | Original release date | U.S. viewers (millions) |
|---|---|---|---|
| 1 | "Secrets of Spike Island" | August 20, 2025 | N/A |
While Phil is on paternity leave, Josh joins Heather at Spike Island, County Cork in Ireland. They conduct a paranormal investigation in the cells of the reportedly haunted former prison.
| 2 | "Ireland's Alcatraz" | August 27, 2025 | N/A |
Heather and Josh conclude their investigation at the fort and the nearby abandoned village on Spike Island.
| 3 | "Curse of the Conjuring" | September 3, 2025 | N/A |
| 4 | "Arctic UFOs" | September 10, 2025 | N/A |
| 5 | "Frozen Aliens" | September 17, 2025 | N/A |
| 6 | "Spanish Zombies" | September 24, 2025 | N/A |
| 7 | "Texas Chupacabra" | October 1, 2025 | N/A |
| 8 | "Rock of Nightmares" | October 8, 2025 | N/A |
| 9 | "The Bridgewater Triangle" | October 15, 2025 | N/A |
| 10 | "Welcome to the Real Derry" | October 22, 2025 | N/A |

=== Season 11 (2026) ===
| No. | Title | Original release date | U.S. viewers (millions) |
|---|---|---|---|
| 1 | "Secrets of Vulture City" | January 7, 2026 | N/A |
Guest investigator Jack Osbourne joins Heather to investigate the ghost town Vulture City.
| 2 | "Atomic Ape Cat" | January 14, 2026 | N/A |
Phil and Heather look into sightings of the "Klickitat ape cat" in the Columbia River Gorge region of Washington state.
| 3 | "Blackbeards Ghost" | January 21, 2026 | N/A |
Heather and Phil head to Ocracoke Island, North Carolina to investigate stories of the ghost of Blackbeard.
| 4 | "Terror Below Deck" | January 28, 2026 | N/A |
| 5 | "God of the Underworld" | February 4, 2026 | N/A |
| 6 | "Terrors of Trinidad" | February 11, 2026 | N/A |
| 7 | "Nightmare Island" | February 18, 2026 | N/A |
| 8 | "Thunderbird" | February 25, 2026 | N/A |
| 9 | "The Spanish Boogeyman" | March 4, 2026 | N/A |
| 10 | "Ghosts of Gettysburg" | March 11, 2026 | N/A |

=== Season 12 (2026) ===
| No. | Title | Original release date | U.S. viewers (millions) |
|---|---|---|---|
| 1 | "Robin Hood's Ghosts" | August 19, 2026 | N/A |
Heather and Phil investigate reports of medieval spirits in the land of the mythical Robin Hood: Nottingham and Sherwood Forest.
| 2 | "Secrets of Sherwood Forest" | August 26, 2026 | N/A |
The team conclude their paranormal investigations around Nottingham, including the old prison at the National Justice Museum.
| 3 | "Curse of the Skinwalkers" | September 2, 2026 | N/A |
Heather and Phil meet with members of the Navajo Nation who claim to have seen a Skinwalker in Northwestern New Mexico.
| 4 | "Ghosts of Guam" | September 9, 2026 | N/A |
Phil and Heather perform a paranormal investigation in search of ghosts from World War II battles in Guam.
| 5 | "Spirits of 1776" | September 16, 2026 | N/A |
Phil, Heather, and guest Jack Osbourne investigate reported hauntings at the sites of Revolutionary War battles at Brandywine and Fort Mifflin in Pennsylvania.

=== Shark Week specials ===
Expedition X aired special episodes during Discovery's Shark Week in 2025 and 2026.

| No. | Title | Original release date | U.S. viewers (millions) |
|---|---|---|---|
| 1 | "Malpelo Monster Shark" | July 23, 2025 | N/A |
Hundreds of miles off the coast of Columbia, Phil and Heather join a scientific team trying to locate and tag El Monstruo, a huge shark seen in the waters off Malpelo Island, home to unique shark populations.
| 2 | "Atomic Sharks" | July 29, 2026 | N/A |
In the Marshall Islands, Heather and Phil join scientists who are testing sharks that could be mutated due to environmental radiation from 20th century U.S. nuclear tests. They explore whether this could be connected to recent unprovoked shark attacks.
