= Tony Sam =

American stand-up comedian and author

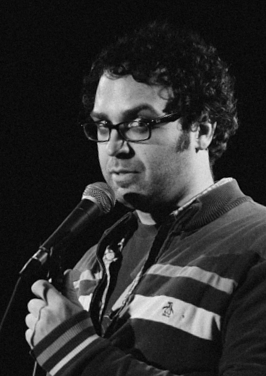
- Tony Sam, in 2013
- Born: Chicago, Illinois
- Education: Florida Atlantic University
- Occupations: TV producer, stand-up comedian, author, actor
- Years active: 2003-present

Tony Sam (also credited as A.W. Sam) is an American stand-up comedian, writer, actor, and Emmy-winning television producer from Chicago, now living in Los Angeles. His debut comedy album, Scaredy Cat, was released on Stand Up! Records in 2014 and in 2015, LA Weekly named him one of 12 Comedy Acts To Watch.

== Early life ==
Sam was born and raised in Chicago. He has a degree in molecular and marine biology from Florida Atlantic University. He worked for several years as a scientist at various jobs, including studying cranio-facial defects in developing zebrafish embryos at Chicago's Children's Memorial Hospital. In 2006, he co-authored a paper in the prestigious medical journal, Nature Medicine.

== Career ==
=== Comedy and television ===
Sam began performing stand-up around 2003 in Chicago, and studied improv and sketch at iO Theater and The Second City Training Center. He became known as an alternative-comedy scenemaker, co-founding (with Brooke Van Poppelen) Chicago Underground Comedy in 2005, a weekly rotating showcase of alternative comics designed to forefront stand-up as opposed to sketch comedy and improv. Kumail Nanjiani was one of the original cast members. Chicago's NewCity called Sam one of the city's most interesting comics in 2009, and praised ChUC as a "mainstay of alternative comedy" and "one of the two best places to perform in Chicago".

Several critics have praised the comic range of Sam's voice; Jake Kroeger of website The Comedy Bureau wrote that it "is so unique, drastically wandering up and down in frequency, that he makes [his] characters exceptionally hilarious and absolutely unforgettable".

Sam's television credits include Cooking Channel's Food: Fact or Fiction? with Michael McKean, Duck Dynasty: The Revival , Josh Gates Tonight, Expedition Unknown, Jay Leno's Garage, Girl Meets Farm, Storage Wars: Barry Strikes Back, Brandi & Jarrod: Married to the Job, MTV's Ridiculousness and the Netflix hit home-renovation show, Instant Dream Home, which in 2023 was nominated and won the Daytime Emmy Award for "Outstanding Instructional and How-To Program".

Sam has also written for Smosh and MTV News. McKean praised Sam's work on Food: Fact or Fiction? in an interview on Andy Richter's podcast, Three Questions with Andy Richter, calling Sam "a very funny writer".

As an actor, Sam has appeared on truTV's Hack My Life, Conan, G4's Attack of the Show!, Food: Fact or Fiction?, and Josh Gates Tonight.

Sam has performed frequently at the Hollywood Improv, and at festivals including the Just For Laughs Comedy Festival, Bridgetown Comedy Festival, San Francisco Comedy & Burrito Festival, Bumbershoot, SF Sketchfest, Chicago Sketch Fest, New York International Fringe Festival, and New York Underground Comedy Festival.

=== Podcasts ===
Sam has hosted several podcasts, including Tony Sam's Word of the Day, a podcast about language begun in 2014. In 2017, he began co-hosting the podcast Legally Insane with Matt Ritter, a lawyer turned comedian.

He has also guested on many other podcasts, including Jackie Kashian's The Dork Forest, Josh Adam Meyers' The 500, Probably Science, Dumb People Town and Sklarboro County with the Sklar Brothers, and The Space Cave with David Huntsberger.

=== Albums ===
Sam's debut album, Scaredy Cat, was recorded May 24, 2014 at Acme Comedy Company in Minneapolis and released later that year on Stand Up! Records. It received generally positive reviews and praise from several high-profile comics including Kyle Kinane, Michelle Buteau, The Sklar Brothers, Beth Stelling, Jason Nash, former SNL cast member, Brooks Wheelan, Brody Stevens and Eddie Pepitone. Jake Krueger of the Los Angeles based review site, The Comedy Bureau, called the album one of the best of 2014, saying it "strikes a great balance between a genuine silliness and unfiltered candor". Ed Placencia of the website Comedy Reviews said "Sam gleefully adds a touch of fun and whimsy to each of his bits. ... Scaredy Cat wonderfully displays that he has decided to embrace the simple tactic of just having a good time." Richard Lanoie of The Serious Comedy Site called it "smart". Huffington Post reviewer Tony Bartolone called the album "refreshingly silly". Chris Spector of Midwest Record wrote that "Sam does a fine job of being that normal guy that lives next door that suddenly, unexpectedly goes nuts."

Four segments from the CD were turned into cartoons by animator Alex Clark.

=== Author ===
In 2021, under the name A.W. Sam, he published a book of poetry, Waste[LA]nd: Poems For L.A., about Los Angeles. In 2022, Sam released his second collection of poetry, Toil. The book was praised by actors Jonah Ray and James Urbaniak.

== Discography ==
- Tony Sam, Scaredy Cat (Stand Up! Records, 2014)

== Books ==
Year	Title	Publisher	ISBN	Pages	Note
2020	WASTELAND: POEMS FOR LA	GRAVEL YARD BOOKS	978-1737893806	79	
2021	TOIL	GRAVEL YARD BOOKS	978-1737893844	97	
2022	THE PERPETUAL PLUMMET OF IMPERFECTION	GRAVEL YARD BOOKS	978-1-7378938-5-1	101	
