= Disappearance of Kenny Veach =

2014 disappearance of YouTuber in Nevada

Kenny Veach
- Born: Kenneth Lee Veach; November 20th, 1967; Clark County, Las Vegas, U.S.
- Disappeared: November 10, 2014 (aged 46–47); Somewhere near Sheep Range, Nevada, U.S.
- Status: Missing for 12 years and 1 day; presumed dead
- Height: 5 ft 8 in (1.73 m)

Kenny Veach (born ca. 1967) is an American outdoorsman and YouTuber who was last sighted on November 10, 2014, near Nellis Air Force Base, Clark County, Nevada, United States. He had ventured into the desert to a cave with an entrance shaped like the letter "M".

Veach, who resided in Las Vegas, was known for his YouTube channel where he shared videos of his adventures in the deserts and mountains of Nevada under the name snakebitmgee. He frequently embarked on solo hikes in remote areas, often seeking out unusual or mysterious locations.

He was unable to find the "M" cave on his second hike to the area, and he failed to return from his third hike to find the cave. No sign of Veach has ever been located, and his whereabouts and fate are unknown.

== Disappearance ==
=== Background ===
External videos
- YouTube videos
- M Cave Hike

Locations
1 Sheep Range

On various online forums, Veach claimed to have hiked countless different mountains and caves in the Mojave and Great Basin deserts. In 2014, Veach, on a YouTube video about the son of an Area 51 technician speaking about some things his father had told him about his job while drunk, Veach posted a since-deleted comment describing a strange experience he had while hiking in the Sheep Range near Area 51. According to Veach, he discovered a cave with an entrance shaped like the letter "M" that made his body vibrate, getting more intense the closer he got to it. This made him feel very scared, making him go back to his car. This comment quickly gained attention from other users, with many encouraging him to return to the site and explore further, while others expressed skepticism.

Motivated by the doubt of many, Kenny made a second trip to find the cave in October 2014. During this trip, Veach reported the sighting of a black ram that watched him from atop a ridge during the entire trip. Ultimately, he failed to locate the cave; however, he recorded the journey and published it on his own YouTube channel under the title "M Cave Hike" on October 18th.

=== Third hike and vanishing ===
Despite increasing concerns and warnings from others, Veach announced plans for a third trip to find the "M cave" after his unsuccessful second trip, this time armed with a gun. On November 10, 2014, Veach is speculated to have set out on his third hike, bringing with him his truck, a cellphone and other supplies necessary for his journey. Veach informed his girlfriend of his plans, but he did not give specific details about the location. This would be the last time anyone saw or heard from him.

Several days after Veach failed to return, his girlfriend reported him missing.

=== The "M Cave" ===
The area where this cave was located is considered to be a remote and challenging area, notorious for its isolation. The landscape is dotted with old mine shafts, some of which had reportedly been used by the military for chemical disposal. The area was difficult to access, requiring Veach to hike around 10 hours in order to reach the vicinity of the M Cave and return to his car. The region also had a reputation for being dangerous, with reports of drug activity and even being a dumping ground for murder victims.

=== Search attempts ===
A search operation was launched, including volunteers and officials from the Nevada Search and Rescue team. Despite an extensive search of the area, no sign of Veach was found, except for his cell phone, which was discovered on November 22 near an abandoned mineshaft in the Sheep Range, and his car, a white Honda CR-V, discovered at the head of the trail. The phone's location suggested that Veach had made it to the general area he intended to explore, but his ultimate fate remained unknown.

=== Later events ===
On November 28, 2021, an episode of HLN's Real Life Nightmare covered Kenny Veach's disappearance.

== Theories ==
The disappearance of Kenny Veach has given rise to a number of theories, ranging from an eventual suicide to him being killed by the U.S. military.

=== Suicide ===
According to Kenny Veach's girlfriend, Sheryon, Veach had struggled with depression for many years, which had worsened in the months leading up to his disappearance. She has said that Veach had expressed thoughts of suicide and mentioned that if he ever decided to take his own life, "no one will ever find me". Sheryon believed that Veach may have intentionally disappeared, possibly taking advantage of the many caves and mineshafts in the Nevada desert to ensure he would not be found.

According to Sheryon, Veach had not taken his video camera with him on this final hike, despite claiming he would bring a GoPro with him on his final video, suggesting he did not intend to document anything, unlike his previous excursions. She believed Veach left his cellphone near an abandoned mineshaft to avoid being tracked. In her comment, she emphasized Kenny's love for the desert but also warned others about the dangers of searching for him or the "M Cave" without proper preparation.

It is unknown if Veach took his handgun with him during his trip, but the firearm has not been found.

=== Accidental death ===
One of the most widely known theories is that Veach met with an accident while hiking in the treacherous and remote terrain. The harsh conditions of the Nevada desert, including extreme temperatures and rugged landscape, could easily lead to a fatal fall or dehydration, especially if Veach ventured into an unknown mine shaft or cave.

=== Military action ===
Alternate theories suggest Veach may have encountered something he was not supposed to, with conspiracy theorists speculating about extraterrestrials or secret military experiments. Some believe that he might have been killed by the U.S. military to prevent him from revealing what he discovered.
