= Kruger Millions =

Gold coin hoard

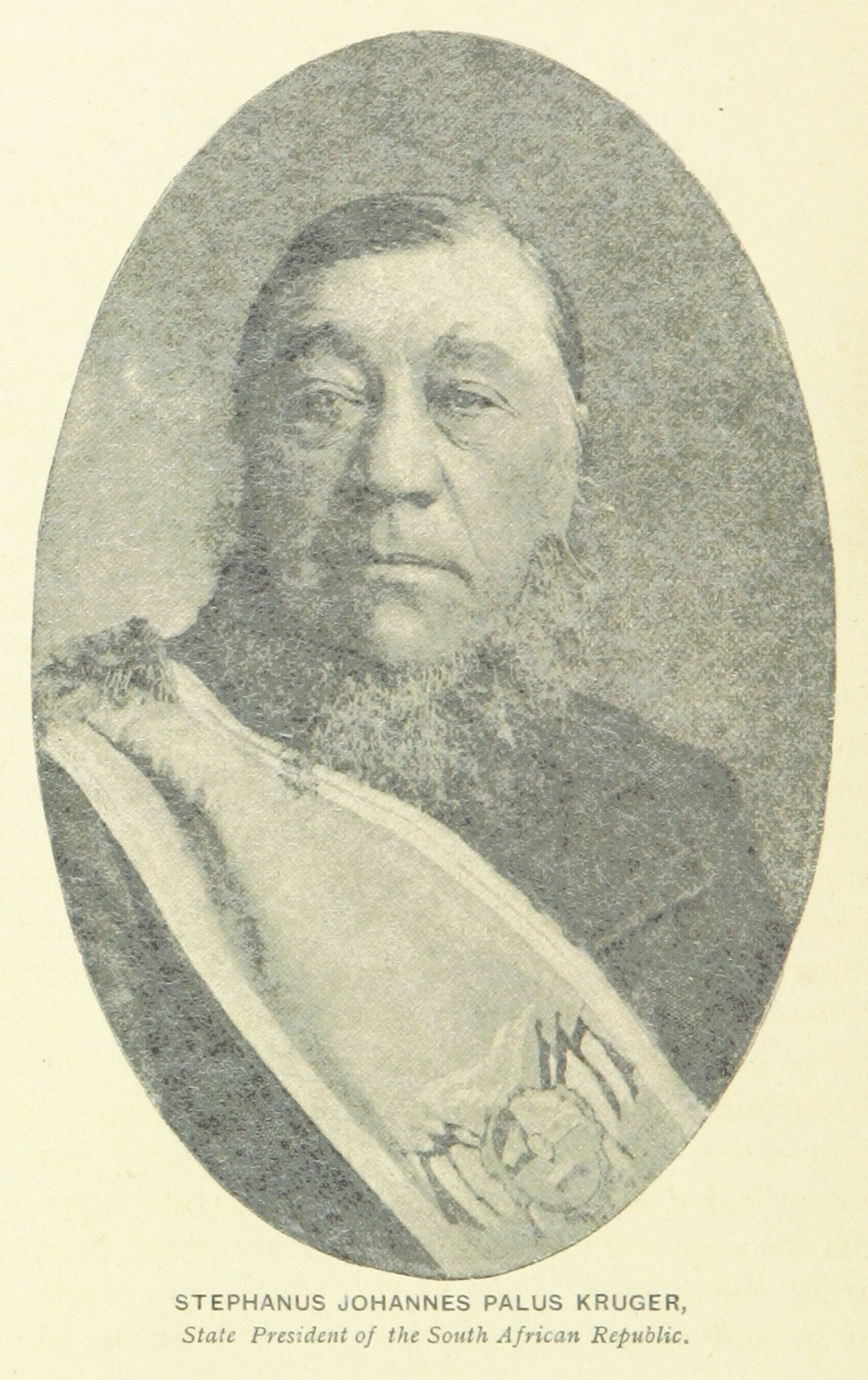
Paul Kruger, President of the South African Republic from 1883 to 1900.

The Kruger Millions is a legendary hoard of gold reputed to have been hidden in South Africa or sent overseas by or on behalf of President Paul Kruger to avoid it being captured by the British during the Second Boer War.

== History ==
The legend begins on the 29 May 1900, as the British prepared to take Pretoria, Paul Kruger and the Zuid Afrikaansche Republiek (Z.A.R.) government fled the capital to Middelburg and had given orders to empty the Mint and National Bank to the Attorney General Jan Smuts.

On the 4 June 1900, with the British forces now at Six Mile Spruit, Jan Smuts arrived at the Mint just before 9am and after meeting with Jules Perrin, Head of the Mint and Thomas Hugo, National Bank Manager, ordered all the gold to be collected, weighed, recorded and made ready for despatch to the Pretoria Train Station.

There are also many anecdotal stories passed down the generations that talk to seeing wooden boxes on wagons being transported the 500m from the Mint in Church Square to the Pretoria Train Station around noon and the train leaving that afternoon on the Delagoa Bay Railway, the only railway still in control of the Z.A.R. at this stage of the war.

The boxes loaded with gold were deposited into the train's baggage compartment. Whilst Ernest Meyer, Master of the Mint and an armed guard of between four and eight men travelled in the passenger compartment. The train arrived at Middelburg at 2am the following day. Meyer stayed to assist with the management of the gold that included the payment of debt to several claimants until 17 July 1900. Following this, Commandant General Meindert Noome, Chief Clerk to the Auditor General, took over from Meyer.

Noome left a diary in which he had noted clearly and carefully in detail that on 31 August 1900 that gold was handed over to a German firm, Wilcken and Ackerman, in Lourenço Marques (Maputo). There were 62 cases of gold and this firm credited the account of the government of the Z.A.R. for the full value. They supplied the Boer forces with a large amount of provisions and necessities amongst which was a total of 44,000 bags of flour.

== Unaccounted-for gold ==
In terms of the gold amounts recorded, this is where accounts differ and the legend of the Kruger Millions begins. Jan Smuts suggests after weighing and recording this data, the gold sent to Middelburg consisted of gold bars, unprocessed gold and approximately 100,000 ponds to the value of 750,000 pond or around 170,000 ounces.

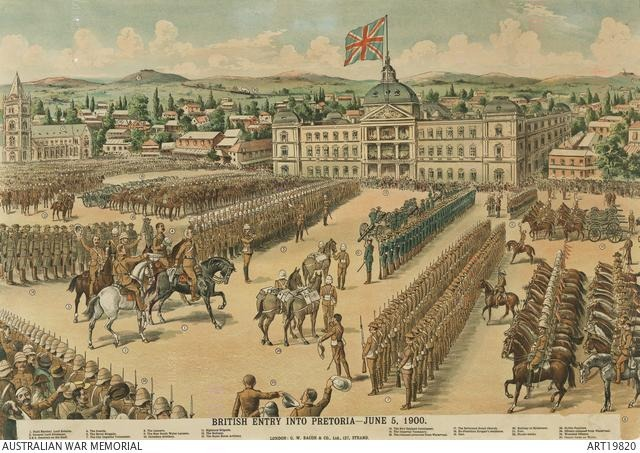
British Army's entry into Pretoria on the 5th June 1900.

The British however suggested these numbers did not match the records they found when Lord Roberts on entering Pretoria on the 5th June 1900 ordered his troops to collect the gold from the Mint - they of course found it empty. The records collected by the British suggested that gold to the value of £2.4 million or 542,500 ounces of gold was confiscated from at least 10 gold mines from the start of the war in October 1899 by the Z.A.R. government. Hedley Chilvers maintained that the total value of the gold bars was £2 million (approximately 480,769 ounces or 1,202 bars) consisting of 183,138 ounces of gold (457 bars) that were taken from the Witwatersrand mines: Robinson Mine (198 bars), Ferreira Deep (104 bars), Ferreira Mine (96 bars) and other small mines (60 bars). His numbers were subsequently proven slightly out certainly for one mine, when the story of the 120,000 ounces or 300 bars of gold discovered at the Robinson Mine was released.

Documents also suggested the Mint and National Bank held a combined 294,000 pond or equivalent up until the 5 June 1900. A number that was reported back to the British governor of the Cape Colony, Lord Alfred Milner (1852-1925).

If we assume that 542,500 ounces was confiscated and we accept the documentary evidence that 294,000 pond (75,430 ounces) was held at both the National Bank and the Mint then we have a total of 617,930 ounces as a starting point. It is then just a matter of mathematics to determine if there was any missing gold.

The first thing we need to deduct is the unspent part of the Government Notes and all the “currency” commandeered under the Kommando Christiaan de Wet which equates to 650,000 pond (166,766 ounces) this brings the number of ounces down to 451,164 ounces.

If we then remove the 750,000 pond (192,422 ounces) removed by Jan Smuts on the 4th June 1900 from the Mint and National Bank and sent to Middelburg, this leaves us with a total of 258,742 ounces of unaccounted gold.

Of interest, it is documented that 788,000 Z.A.R. 1900 Ponds had been minted in the first five months of 1900. This seems very unlikely as the most ever minted in a full year was 336,000 in 1895 on the only minting press available "Oom Paul" - the feat would just be physically impossible if they continued to work the same hours, which they did, up until the 4 June 1900. There are however many examples of the 1898 minted coins, none of the 1899 coin (the 1899 die created in Germany had been confiscated on route by the British before it got to Pretoria) and rimmed and non-rimmed pond blanks that were ready for striking. The latter, called the kaal pond (naked pound) were used by the Z.A.R. government to pay for expenses and salaries in absence of minted coins whilst operating in exile out of Machadodorp, Waterval Boven and finally Hectorspruit. A witness, a Mr. J. P. Kloppers, who was an employee of the then government, stated in an affidavit, that he had seen the Government on wheels, in the three last mentioned stations, at two of which, he received salaries for the officials at Noordkaap. These salaries were paid out 75% in "Bluebacks" (paper money) and 25% in properly minted gold coins. Towards the end of 1901, the Government convoy went to Steenkampsberg, where Mr. Kloppers again visited them. He states that he definitely did not see any more coined pounds, or blanks at that stage.

As the Second Boer War continued for almost another two years after the Z.A.R. government had been exiled from Pretoria it suggests that perhaps the remaining gold coins taken from the mint in were finally used up here. The last minted Z.A.R. coin was in Pilgrim's Rest between 10 May 1902 and 31 May 1902 or 08/09 June 1902 and were known as the Veld Pond but uncertainty remains as to how many coins were actually minted with number between 525-968 coins. Whilst most of these numbers are anecdotal the only handwritten document that perhaps gives the most conclusive number is from Mr W.J.H. Barter, who was the treasurer of the Mint Commission in the field, who certified that only 560 coins were ever minted.

== Destination Europe ==
Paul Kruger never stayed long in Machadodorp and instead carried onto Lourenço Marques officially leaving the Zuid Afrikaansche Republiek for the last time on what was meant to be a six month trip to Europe on the 11 September 1900. On his arrival at Lourenço Marques however he was put under house arrest by the Portuguese Governor at the behest of the local British Consul preventing him from boarding the first outgoing steamer, the Herzog of the German East Africa Line. About a month later Queen Wilhelmina of the Netherlands concluded a deal with Britain to extricate Kruger on a Dutch warship, HNLMS Gelderland. It has long been speculated that Kruger was carrying a large quantity of gold with him on this trip that he was hoping to use to acquire weapons for the war, this however due to the house arrest is very unlikely.

If any gold did land up in Europe then it is more likely that the gold left for Europe before Kruger got to Lourenço Marques through more discreet means.

In this regard it is believed that sometime in May 1900, select members of the Z.A.R. government held a secret meeting where it was decided to move the majority of the remaining gold held at the Mint and National Bank to European bank accounts owned by the Z.A.R. predominantly in the Netherlands. In so doing, moving the gold out of the reach of the British and close enough to allies where it could be used to fund the war effort. The man said to be charged with the responsibility of managing the gold in these Z.A.R. owned European accounts was Dr Willem Leyds.

As the story goes sometime around 20 May 1900 it is believed the Z.A.R. Mint secretly moved this gold out of the Z.A.R. to Europe via the Delagoa Railway and onto the German Imperial post steamer SS Bundesrat another German East Africa Line ship that left Lourenço Marques on the 22nd May 1900. We know the ship docked at Vlissingen in the Netherlands on 11 July 1900 with a cargo of 210,000 ounces of gold from Southern Africa. This sum of gold remains very similar to the speculated 258,742 ounces that are unaccounted for. The associated documents for the gold declared that it belonged to the Nederlandsche Crediet Vereniging (Nederlandsche Bank & Crediet Vereniging voor Zuid Afrika - now Nedbank.) But how this single bank got hold of and was able to transport such a huge amount of gold out of Z.A.R. during the war is actually quite impossible without the Z.A.R. involvement as they had banned gold export out of the Z.A.R. as of 20 March 1900. As such it is thought that this gold did in fact belong to the Z.A.R. and that this is where Kruger's Millions landed up rather than being buried somewhere in the veld.

The legend of the Kruger Millions being buried somewhere in the veld did not start in 1900. Certainly from very early on the British suspected the gold had moved to Europe. When Neville Chamberlain met with the Boer Generals at the House of Commons in England on 5 November 1902, who had come to see him with a view to obtaining financial assistance, for the widows and orphans, he suggested that he was quite prepared to let the Generals have, for the benefit of the widows and orphans the Z.A.R. funds moved to Europe by Kruger, which were still unspent, if they would help him (Chamberlain) to lay his hands upon them. General Botha expressed his readiness to do so, but strenuously denied that any such funds existed.

== Kruger Millions in the news ==
The British Government did not believe the Boer Generals and according to the news of the day were still actively looking for the funds a year later.

It was only in 1905 when a certain horse thief by the name of John Holtzhausen on the 29 September 1905 (some three years after the Second Boer War and a year after the death of Paul Kruger), whilst awaiting trial in prison in Kimberley, suggested he was the last of three men who knew the whereabouts of the two million pounds in buried gold and diamonds (clearly being held in Kimberley diamonds were a new addition to the story) that lay hidden in the Blyde River area in the province of Mpumalanga.

Later this same story was picked up by a journalist Gustav Preller and adapted it to himself becoming the main protagonist. In 'The Star' of 7 November 1931, he wrote of the important role he played in preventing the gold of the Z.A.R. from landing in the hands of the British forces. This story gave the impression of being a true story and the headline in 'The Star' proclaimed 'A True Story of the Kruger Millions' by Gustav Preller. Being written in the heart of the Great Depression, a huge treasure of gold and diamonds buried somewhere in the Lowveld fueled the imagination of the day.

In 1929, Colonel Denys Reitz, son of President Reitz declared that after the war only £80,000 remained of the Kruger Millions and that this had been sold to France to aid the Boer refugees. He primarily made this statement to try stop the damage to the country side, graves and historic places by over enthusiastic treasure hunters.

In 1947, a Mr H. J. Lessing claimed to have found a portion of the treasure at Laurenco Marques, after following a map stitched into the cover of his father's Bible. This story was never corroborated but did make international headlines.

A South African musical drama, Die Krugermiljoene (1967), proposed a version of the disappearance of these millions.

In 2001, the Citizen reported that an African family in the 1960s had found 4,000 "Kruger" ponds with a mint date of 1889 on farm land near Ermelo area which they had been selling on a piecemeal basis - this proved to be a rather exciting for the general public with many people descending on Ermelo to find their fortune. This story ultimately proved to be a rather elaborate hoax to attract tourism to Ermelo by Athol Stark, the Ermelo councillor who headed up the Tourism Board for the town. "Kruger" ponds only started being minted in 1892 not 1889 as the story attests.

In 2016, an April Fools article by the Northcliff Melville Times claimed that the Millions had been found at Emmarentia Dam.

== The "Lost Hoard" ==
In 2021, the only news report that has held any merit around the discovery of the Kruger Millions in the last one hundred years was printed on the 25 February. In the article it was reported that a hoard of Kruger ponds and half-ponds had been discovered in a Swiss vault and were auctioned off. This collection of coins labelled the "Lost Hoard" was made up of 910 coins consisting of 677 ponds and 233 half ponds of different dates ranging from 1893 to 1900 and quality. Due to the significance of the find the hoard was acquired in its entirety by the SA Mint a wholly owned subsidiary of the South African Reserve Bank (SARB).

The Kruger ponds found in the hoard have been independently verified and graded by the Numismatic Guarantee Corporation in Florida, United States of America. The collection was discovered in an original Z.A.R. National Bank money bag where it is believed the coins remained for over a hundred years. According to the SA Mint the coins were originally stored in the Netherlands before being sent to Switzerland for safe keeping during World War II.

The Lost Hoard coins have subsequently been sold as individual lots by the SA Mint in two sets. The first set features an 1893-1900 Lost Hoard Kruger half-pond together with a privy-mark labelled "The Lost Hoard" proof 2019 1/10 gold oz Krugerrand. The second set comprises an 1893-1900 Lost Hoard Kruger full pond and a privy-mark also labelled with "The Lost Hoard" on the 2019 quarter oz gold proof Krugerrand. Both sets come with a booklet on the history of the Kruger Ponds by Professor François Malan and a replica of the Z.A.R. National Bank bag in which they were found.

== Conclusion ==
How these coins came to be in the Netherlands and later the Swiss vault and who owned them or provided the necessary provenance has not been disclosed but that they were supposedly found in a genuine Zuid Afrikaansche Republiek National Bank bag certainly lends some credence to the stories that some of the Kruger Millions were sent to Europe.

Due to the nature of secret war time activity there is not a lot of written evidence and all parties involved have since passed. This unfortunately leaves a lot of room for speculation and disagreement, including in this article, and as such the marvel and mystery of the legend of the Kruger Millions will endure.
