= Jess Phoenix =

American volcanologist

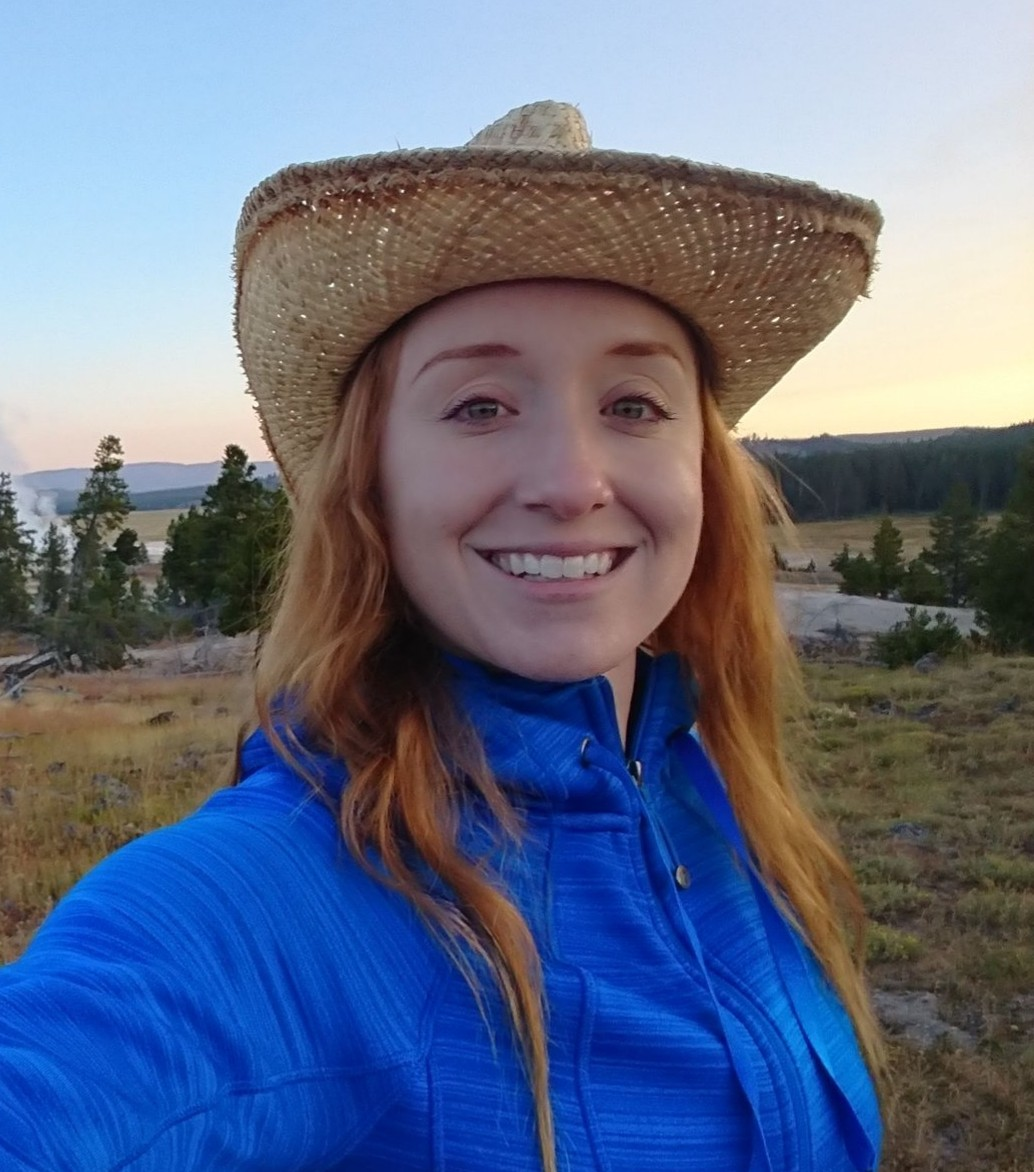
- Jess Phoenix at Yellowstone caldera in 2018
- Other name: Jess Peláez
- Education: Smith College; California State University
- Occupations: Volcanologist; Writer; TV personality

Jess Phoenix (born 1982) is an American volcanologist, writer and multimedia personality. She is the Science Ambassador of the Union of Concerned Scientists. She ran as a Democratic candidate for the U.S. House of Representatives. She is the co-host of the Discovery series Hunting Atlantis and the author of Ms. Adventure.

== Early life and education ==
Phoenix grew up in Colorado, United States, with two parents who are FBI agents. She holds a Bachelor of Arts degree in history from Smith College and a master's degree in geology from California State University, Los Angeles, with a thesis titled Lava Flow Morphologies and Structural Features Along the Axis of the South Rift Zone of Loihi Seamount, Hawaii. Phoenix later enrolled in a PhD program with the School of Earth and Atmospheric Sciences at Queensland University of Technology in Australia studying Mexico's Sierra Madre Occidental range, but withdrew after falling out with her PhD advisor.

== Books ==
Phoenix has written a memoir titled Ms. Adventure: My Wild Explorations in Science, Lava, and Life published by Timber Press, a division of Workman Publishing Group, 2021. The book was nominated as a finalist for the 2022 AAAS/Subaru SB&F Prize for Excellence in Science Books in the category of Young Adult Science.

== Media ==
Phoenix has appeared in the Discovery series Trailblazers in 2016, Devil Sharks in 2017, and Science Channel's series What on Earth? in 2015. In 2021 she was a co-host with Stel Pavlou of the Discovery series Hunting Atlantis. Hunting Atlantis has been criticized by scientists from the archaeology, anthropology, and history communities for pseudoscience and misrepresenting history and archaeology for entertainment purposes.

== Political career ==
Phoenix was a candidate in the 2018 election to represent California in the US House of Representatives in the 25th Congressional District in California. She lost in the Democratic primary on June 5, 2018, finishing in fourth place with 6.4% of the vote.

== Personal life ==
Phoenix is married to Carlos Peláez. They both changed their last names to Phoenix in 2012. Together they founded Blueprint Earth, a volunteer-based non-profit focused on cataloging the ecosystem in one square kilometer of the Mojave Desert.
