= Project Recover =

- Founders: Patrick Scannon, Ph.D., M.D.
- Established: 1993; 33 years ago
- Mission: Project Recover is a collaborative effort to enlist 21st-century science and technology in a quest to find and repatriate Americans missing in action since World War II, in order to provide recognition and closure for families and the Nation.
- Key people: President and CEO: Derek Abbey, Ph.D. Chairman: Dan Friedkin; Project PI: Mark Moline, Ph.D. Project PI: Eric Terrill, Ph.D. Lead Archaeologist: Andrew Pietruszka, Ph.D. Lead Historian: Colin Colbourn, Ph.D. Administrator: Daniel T. O’Brien
- Formerly called: The BentProp Project, Ltd.
- Website: www.projectrecover.org

Project Recover is an organization dedicated to gathering information that can lead to the location, identification, and repatriation of remains of U.S. service members who were killed in action in the Republic of Palau (in the western Pacific) during WWII, and who are still listed as missing in action. The effort was begun in 1993 by Dr. Pat Scannon. Project Recover team members have backgrounds in SCUBA diving, aviation (with particular focus on World War II-vintage aircraft) and the history of American World War II involvement in the Pacific.

The Project Recover team works closely with DPAA the Defense POW/MIA Accounting Agency (formerly known as JPAC, or the Joint POW/MIA Accounting Command), a joint-services organization based at Hickam Air Force Base in Honolulu, Hawaii. Basically, the BentProp team attempts to locate and identify sites that are associated with known U.S. MIAs, and to provide sufficient information about those sites to DPAA to help them justify mounting official recovery missions.

Of the roughly 200 U.S. aircraft and their crews shot down in Palau between late March 1944 and August 1945, about half crashed outside Palau's barrier reef in water that is several thousand feet deep, putting their location and recovery well beyond the technical capability and resources of Project Recover. But there are still nearly 100 planes with crash sites thought to be on some of Palau's 200 or more islands, or in relatively shallow water inside the barrier reef. These sites are the targets of BentProp Project's research and field expeditions.

Not affiliated with or sponsored by any private or governmental agencies, Project Recover team's volunteers do extensive research at the College Park, Maryland research facility of the National Archives and Records Administration and at various military archives around the world. They also conduct interviews with surviving service members, often at such gatherings as Squadron Reunions, and interviews with Palauan elders who were alive in Palau during the Japanese occupation.

The team's field work is done in Palau during yearly expeditions that are usually about a month in duration. Because many U.S. aircraft shot down in Palau in 1944-1945 crashed in surrounding waters, the Project Recover team has done extensive underwater searching, using such tools as a towed caesium magnetometer and side-scan sonar. The team also does extensive land searches in the jungles of Palau, to follow up leads generated through local interviews and the team's archival research.

To date, DPAA has sent recovery teams including forensic anthropologists, archaeologists, and Navy divers to investigate several sites that have been located and identified by the BentProp team. Some sites have yielded remains, which have been returned to DPAA's forensic lab in Hawaii for identification.

The BentProp Project's work has been chronicled in a documentary, "Last Flight Home," produced by Dan O'Brien and Jennifer Powers, and a book, "Vanished," by Wil Hylton.

== Notable projects ==
Success to date includes the location and identification of many previously unknown U.S. crash sites, both underwater and on land. After a 10-year search, for example, in 2004 Project Recover located the underwater crash site of a B-24 shot down near the Palauan capital city of Koror on 1 September 1944. This aircraft carried a crew of 11, three of whom parachuted out successfully only to be captured, interrogated, and executed by the Japanese. In 2014, DPAA divers recovered remains at the underwater crash site of an F6F Hellcat located by the Project Recover team.

Location of the remains of the other eight B-24 crew members who went down with the aircraft was the objective of three recovery teams from JPAC, which mounted recovery missions to the underwater site in 2005, 2007, and 2008. Remains were recovered during all three of these JPAC missions, and the site was officially "closed" at the end of the 2008 mission, in the sense that JPAC believes that they have located all recoverable remains associated with the site. In early 2009, JPAC announced that they had recovered remains of all eight of the B-24's crew members. They were able to positively identify five of those eight, and over the course of the spring and summer of 2009, remains were returned to their families. JPAC was convinced that they also recovered remains of the other three, but there was insufficient structural and DNA information to determine which was which, so the three were buried in a group ceremony with the others at Arlington National Cemetery in the spring of 2010.

The Project Recover team continues to actively seek the execution/burial site of the three B-24 crew members who parachuted out of the stricken aircraft but were immediately captured by the Japanese. Considerable progress toward that end was made during (and in extensive archival research prior to) the 2009 expedition.

In 2018, Project Recover discovered the remains of a B-24 named "Heaven Can Wait" in Hansa Bay; the remains were later recovered and repatriated by the Defense POW/MIA Accounting Agency in May 2023.

In 2021, the documentary film To What Remains, which focuses on Project Recover’s recovery of over 80,000 American WWII MIA remains, was released.
