= Mandt =

Mandt may refer to:

- Mandt (surname)
- Mandt Township, Chippewa County, Minnesota, a township in Chippewa County, Minnesota, United States

== See also ==
- Mandt Bros. Productions, an American production company
