= Mandt (surname) =

Mandt is a surname of Dutch origin. Notable people with the surname include:

- André Mandt (born 1993), German footballer
- Martin Wilhelm von Mandt (1799–1858), Prussian physician and naturalist
- Michael Mandt (born 1971), American television producer
- Neil Mandt (born 1969), American television producer
- Sonja Mandt (born 1960), Norwegian politician
