= Hijacking Hollywood =

- Directed by: Neil Mandt
- Written by: Neil Mandt; Jim Rossow
- Produced by: Neil Mandt
- Starring: Henry Thomas; Scott Thompson; Mark Metcalf; Neil Mandt
- Cinematography: Anton Floquet
- Edited by: Charlie Webber
- Music by: Erik Lundmark
- Production company: Broken Twig Productions
- Distributed by: Curb Entertainment
- Release date: 6 June 1997
- Running time: 91 minutes
- Country: United States
- Language: English

Hijacking Hollywood is a 1997 American comedy film directed by Neil Mandt, starring Henry Thomas and Scott Thompson.

== Cast ==
- Henry Thomas as Kevin Conroy
- Scott Thompson as Russell
- Mark Metcalf as Michael Lawrence
- Neil Mandt as Tad Sheen
- Nicole Gian as Sarah Lawrence
- Helen Duffy as Mother
- Paul Hewitt as Harvey
- Art LaFleur as Eddie
- Shirly Brener as Ginger Roget
- Jf Pryor as Shaft
- Steve Van Wormer as Tony
- Mark Holton as Officer #1
- Randy West as Porno Guy #1
- Michael Mandt as Porno Guy #2

== Reception ==
Nathan Rabin of The A.V. Club wrote that the film "tends to shy away from broad, universally known Hollywood stereotypes in favor of sharply drawn characters", and is "far more compelling than most films of its ilk."

Dick Fiddy of RadioTimes rated the film 3 stars out of 5 and wrote, "Rewarding and constantly amusing, this is an independent comedy that deserved greater exposure than straight-to-video obscurity."

Leonard Klady of Variety wrote that Mandt has "concocted a tight little morality tale that pays off with an ironic twist".

TV Guide called the film "merely likable" and "seldom memorable."
