= Frommer's =

Travel guidebook series

- Founded: 1957
- Founder: Arthur Frommer
- Country of origin: United States
- Distribution: Worldwide
- Official website: frommers.com

Frommer's (/ˈfroʊmərz/) is a travel guide book series created by Arthur Frommer in 1957. Frommer's has since expanded to include more than 350 guidebooks in 14 series, as well as other media including an eponymous radio show and a website. Frommer has maintained a travel-related blog on the company's website since 2007.

== History ==
In 1957, Arthur Frommer, then a corporal in the U.S. Army, wrote a travel guide for American GIs in Europe, and then produced a civilian version called Europe on $5 a Day. The book ranked popular landmarks and sights in order of importance and included suggestions on how to travel around Europe on a budget. It was the first travel guide to show Americans that they could afford to travel in Europe.

Frommer returned to the United States and began practicing law. During that time, he continued to write and also began to self-publish guidebooks to additional destinations, including New York, Mexico, Hawaii, Japan and the Caribbean. In 1977, Frommer’s trademark was sold to Simon & Schuster, Inc. Pearson bought the reference division of Simon & Schuster in 1998 and sold it to IDG Books in 1999. John Wiley & Sons acquired IDG Books (renamed Hungry Minds) in 2001. Arthur’s daughter, Pauline Frommer, was writing her own series of travel guidebooks and continuing the Frommer’s travel legacy.

On August 13, 2012, it was announced that Google was acquiring Frommer's for an undisclosed sum. In April 2013, it was announced that the Frommer's brand had been reacquired by Arthur Frommer and his daughter, Pauline Frommer. In July 2013, Arthur Frommer struck a deal with Publishers Group West to distribute and promote Frommer's books.

== Guidebook series ==
More than 75 million copies of Frommer's guide books have been sold since 1957.

Over 350 titles are available in the following series:

- Frommer’s Complete Guides
- Frommer’s EasyGuides
- Frommer's Day by Day for over 70 travel destinations
- Frommer’s Portable Guides
- Frommer’s Irreverent Guides
- Frommer’s Memorable Walks
- Frommer’s PhraseFinder & Dictionaries
- Frommer’s Driving Tours
- Pauline Frommer’s Guides
- Frommer’s National Park Guides

== See also ==
- Lonely Planet

== In popular culture ==
Frommer's guidebooks are represented in the 2004 comedy EuroTrip when one of the main characters, Jamie, uses it to guide a group of teenagers around Europe. Jamie later gets a job with Frommer's at the end of EuroTrip. In the opening scene of 2003's Charlie's Angels: Full Throttle, Cameron Diaz enters a Mongolian beer shack holding a Frommer's guidebook. A copy can also be seen near the beginning of the 2008 film Jumper. Frommer's guides have also been a plot point on the TV series This is Us and have been used as clues on Jeopardy! a number of times. Complete references from the Frommer's Guide book for Traveling around the world can be seen in the movie Last Stop for Paul.
