= Mandt Bros. Productions =

- Company type: Privately held
- Industry: Television, Film
- Founded: 2001; 25 years ago
- Headquarters: Hollywood, California, United States
- Key people: Neil Mandt, Michael Mandt

Mandt Bros. Productions is a Los Angeles-based production company founded by brothers Neil and Michael Mandt. The brothers are partners in the Los Angeles based creative studio and are the Producers of the Golden Globe Awards. The company was formed in 2001 and has experience of television, film, internet, immersive and mobile audiences. In addition to creating traditional content, the brothers have built and operated multiple turn-key production facilities and are in virtual and augmented reality content creation.

Some of the company’s notable credits include the development and creation of the hit ESPN series, Jim Rome is Burning, the Syfy Channel series Destination Truth, The Shed for Food Network, The Car Show with Adam Carolla for Speed, Strangers in Danger for Fuel, My Crazy Life for E!, Sports Jobs with Junior Seau for Versus, Next Stop for Charlie for Showtime and the production of ABC’s Frozen Christmas Parade.

On the feature film side, the Mandt Brothers were Co-producers of Walt Disney Picture’s Million Dollar Arm starring Jon Hamm and Alan Arkin. The movie's crew was made up of many big names in Hollywood, including director Craig Gillespie (I Tonya, Lars and The Real Girl,) Oscar Winning screenwriter Tom McCarthy, prolific producers Joe Roth, Mark Ciardi & Gordon Gray, and two-time Oscar winning composer A.R. Rahman. In 2018, A24 and DirecTV partnered to release the brother's latest movie, The Last Movie Star. The picture starred Hollywood legend Burt Reynolds in his last leading role and received both critical and audience acclaim. The cast is rounded out with stellar performances from Chevy Chase, Ariel Winter, Clark Duke and Ellar Coltrane. The brother's 2007 indie film, Last Stop for Paul, collected a top prize at more than 50 film festivals around the world and was later developed into a 19-episode television series for Showtime, which was also produced by the Brothers.

Apart from their work at Mandt Bros. Productions, Neil and Michael are both veteran producers of NBC’s coverage of the 2000 Olympic Games in Sydney and were the producers of the first live MMA fights in Chinese television history. Some of Michael’s other live sport credits include: NBA Finals, NFL Pro Bowl, X-Games, US Open Tennis, MLB All Star Game, MLB World Series, and The Match: Tiger Woods vs Phil Mickelson to name a few.

Neil has directed a number of short films under the Mandt Bros. banner, which have starred the likes of Bruce Willis, Samuel L. Jackson, Mathew Perry, Justin Timberlake, John Hamm, Seth Meyers, Jamie Foxx, and Will Ferrell to name a few. Neil has also worked as a journalist for Post-Newsweek, CBS and ABC News, where he was the producer of the O.J. Simpson Criminal Trial.

== Productions ==
Television

- ESPN Reel Classics Uncut
- Ice Brigade
- Speed Dating
- Beg, Borrow & Deal
- My Crazy Life
- Jim Rome is Burning
- Next Stop for Charlie
- Sports Jobs with Junior Seau
- Destination Truth

Film

- The Million Dollar Kid
- Arthur's Quest
- Hijacking Hollywood
- Last Stop for Paul
- Dog Years
