= The Prince and the Surfer =

- VHS Cover
- Directed by: Arye Gross; Gregory Gieras
- Written by: Gregory Poppen (screenplay); Mark Twain book "The Prince and the Pauper"
- Produced by: Steven Paul; Patrick Ewald; Hank Paul; Dorothy Paul
- Starring: Sean Kellman; Robert Englund; Vincent Schiavelli
- Cinematography: Thomas Harding
- Edited by: Dennis O'Connor
- Music by: Erik Lundmark
- Distributed by: A-pix
- Release date: December 21, 1999 (Video)
- Running time: 89 minutes
- Country: United States
- Language: English

The Prince and the Surfer is a 1999 comedy direct-to-video film about a prince who switches places with a Southern California surfer and skateboarder. It was directed by Arye Gross and Gregory Gieras, and stars Sean Kellman, Robert Englund, and Vincent Schiavelli.

== Synopsis ==
The film is an updated adaptation of the 1881 novel The Prince and the Pauper by Mark Twain set in Southern California beach culture, featuring a prince and, instead of a pauper, the skateboarding surfer Cash, who wants to be rich and escape his boring life. The Queen of Gelfland brings her son, prince Edward, to the United States, seeking a trade treaty; the young prince wants to escape his life, to spend time among the common people. During Edward's one permitted limousine ride near the beach, Cash skitches with the limo on its way back to the hotel, and meets Edward in his suite; the two hatch their plan to trade places, and separate. Unbeknownst to them, the evil Minister Kratski plots to undermine the Queen's efforts, and instead convert Gelfland into Golfland. While pursuing princess Galina, Cash learns of the minister's plan. Meanwhile, Edward pursues Cash's friend Melissa, enjoying and enduring life in the suburbs. In the end, Cash and Edward reunite to save the day.

== Cast ==
- Sean Kellman as Cash Canty / Prince Edward of Gelfland
- Robert Englund as Kratski
- Vincent Schiavelli as Baumgarten
- Jennifer O'Neill as Queen Albertina
- Jason Strickland as CT
- Linda Cardellini as Melissa
- Shepard Koster as Peter
- Arye Gross as Vince
- C. Thomas Howell as Dean
- Katie Johnston as Galina
- Allyce Beasley as Constance
- Gregory Poppen as Bodybuilder
- Steven Green as Bodyguard
- Lawrence DiBlasio as Bodyguard
- Alyse Mandel as Maid

The film also featured uncredited performances by Timothy Bottoms as Johnny Canty, Phil Bowers, Jason Reid as Riff, Jon Voight as the film's presenter, and Denise Wilson as Tattooed Woman.

== Production and release ==
The film marked the directorial debut of actor Arye Gross. Filming locations included Agoura Hills, Los Angeles, and Venice, California, USA.

It was released directly to video in 1999, DVD in 2000 and 2004, rated PG for "brief mild language".

== Reception ==
Reviews of the film were mildly positive. Brian Webster of online Apollo Guide gave the film a score of 69 percent, calling the film "decent, but unspectacular family entertainment, with plenty of minor thrills and laughs for the eight to 12-year-old set." Though he found it to be predictable, with nothing to particularly recommend, he also found "no major failings". He granted that secondary characters were mere "stereotypes (including those played by the screenwriter and one of the co-directors)", but that the young stars had "energy and just enough acting talent to pull it off." He found Cardellini to be "a decently spunky Melissa".

The Pound Shop movie review site relates that it is "fairly clear that this is a movie for the kiddies", but that it was "pretty unreasonable" to not have "one single instance of surfing". The reviewer found that the "stand out elements of this movie" include "Erik Lundmark’s Casio keyboard score. While clearly made with a very limited amount of time, and money, I feel it is one of the few movie soundtracks that really help move the film along." Also, the "banter between the incompetent security guards at the resort actually finds its mark every now and again as well," and overall, the acting was satisfactory. Summarizing, the review stated the film is "worth a pound."

AllRovi.com reviewer Mark Deming gave the film two (of five) stars.
