= Eric Christian Olsen =

American actor

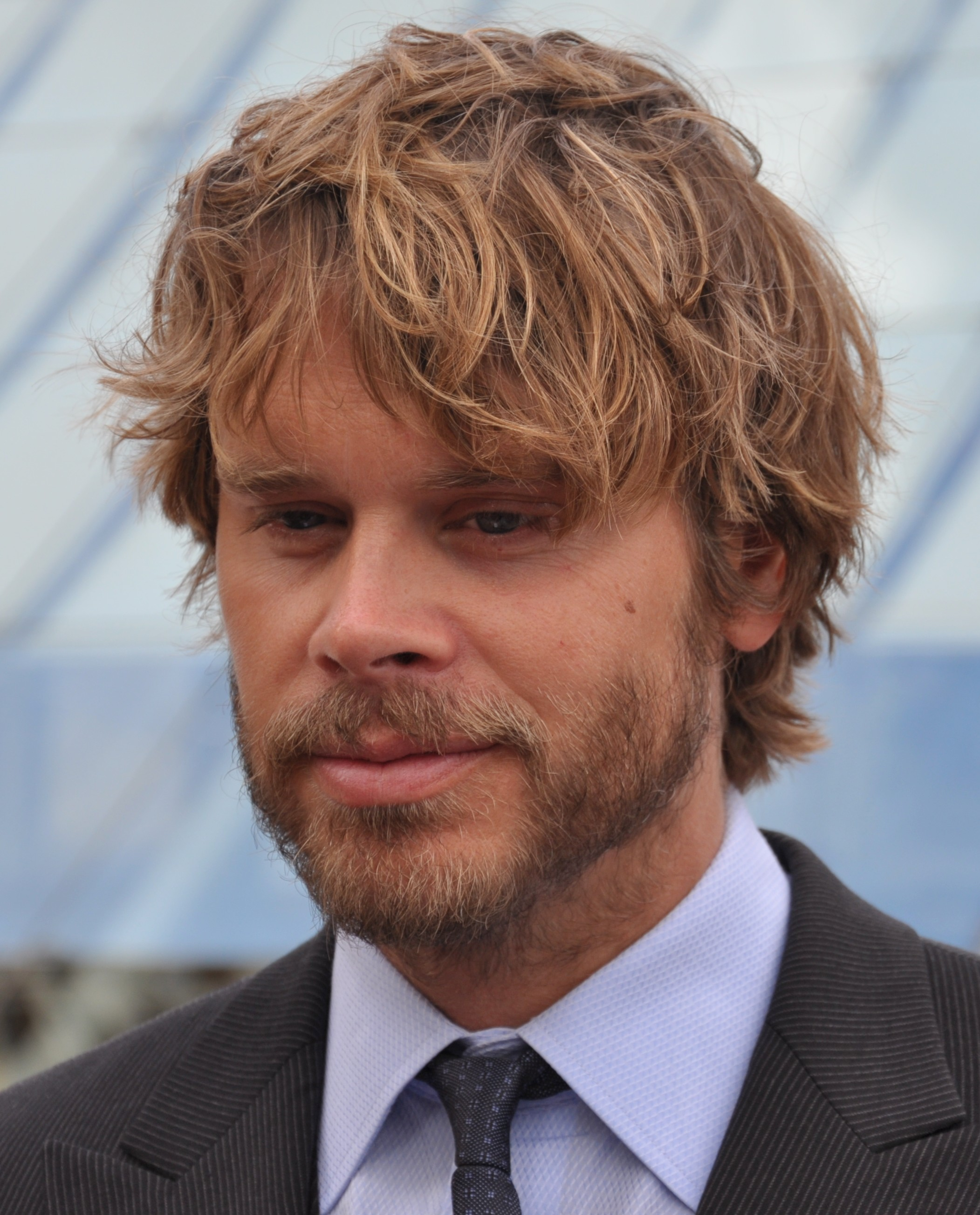
- Olsen in 2013
- Born: May 31, 1977 (age 49); Eugene, Oregon, U.S.
- Occupation: Actor
- Years active: 1997–present
- Spouse: Sarah Wright (m. 2012)
- Children: 4
- Relatives: Daniela Ruah (sister-in-law)

Eric Christian Olsen (born May 31, 1977) is an American actor. He is known for his portrayals of Investigator Marty Deeks on the CBS television series NCIS: Los Angeles, Austin in the film Not Another Teen Movie, Lloyd Christmas in Dumb and Dumberer: When Harry Met Lloyd and as producer/executive producer on the 2024 reboot of Matlock.

== Early life ==
Olsen was born in Eugene, Oregon, the son of Jeanne (née Donstad), a non-denominational chaplain, and Paul V. Olsen, a professor of English, and head track and cross country coach of Augustana College in Rock Island, Illinois. He has an older brother, David, who acts as his stunt double; David is married to actress and Olsen's NCIS: Los Angeles costar Daniela Ruah. Olsen is of Norwegian descent. Olsen spent most of his childhood in Bettendorf, Iowa, and attended Bettendorf Middle and High School, where he pursued interests such as sports, Japanese, and Chinese. In addition to many local theatre performances, Olsen trained in improv with ComedySportz Quad Cities and later joined the cast.

== Career ==
Olsen's first starring role was the title role in the 1999 TV movie Arthur's Quest. Soon after, he gave an Emmy submitted portrayal of a dying burn victim on NBC's ER. His next role was a small one in HBO's Black Cat Run. He soon landed a starring role in the Fox TV series Get Real, playing Cameron Green. The series lasted for a year before he made his transition onto the big screen when he played Ben Affleck's gunner in Pearl Harbor, that was quickly followed by a leading role as Austin "The Cocky Blond Guy" in the teen send up feature film Not Another Teen Movie.

Olsen next played Jake in the teen comedy The Hot Chick. In 2003, he won the role of Lloyd Christmas in Dumb and Dumberer: When Harry Met Lloyd, the prequel to the hit movie Dumb and Dumber. Olsen followed that up by playing opposite Chris Evans for a second time in Cellular. He starred in the yet to be released Mojave and then joined the final season of Fox's Tru Calling. He claimed three roles in 2006 and 2007 with the release of Beerfest, License to Wed and Zach Braff's The Last Kiss. Olsen co-starred as Sully in the Fox sitcom The Loop.

In 2009, he appeared in several episodes of the first season of the Community sitcom, as Vaughn, a usually shirtless, neo-hippie student, musician, and athlete. Olsen appeared on Will Ferrell and Adam McKay's streaming video website Funny or Die, with a small series of segments featuring a character called Perry Hilton, a parody of Paris Hilton. He starred in the 2011 science-fiction horror film The Thing.

Olsen portrayed Detective Marty Deeks on the CBS show NCIS: Los Angeles. His character appeared in two episodes of season one before joining the cast as a series regular in the second season. Olsen's sister-in-law, Daniela Ruah, was one of his co-stars.

Olsen is a producer of a short film Bald from 2014 and executive producer of a documentary Andy Irons: Kissed by God from 2018. He has his own production company Cloud Nine Productions. In 2019 he started his first show as an executive producer picked up in production for Hulu called Woke.

Olsen made his writing debut with the season 11 episode 10 (the 250th overall episode) of NCIS: Los Angeles titled "Mother", which aired December 1, 2019.

== Personal life ==
Olsen became engaged to actress Sarah Wright in October 2011. They were married near Jackson Hole, Wyoming, on June 23, 2012. They have a son and three daughters.

Olsen and Wright were featured in a 2015 episode of the HGTV series House Hunters buying a vacation home near Jackson Hole. Olsen works with the charity Hats Off for Cancer as an Honorary Board Member and Spokesperson, featured on their Public Service Announcement video. He and his wife Sarah are members of Board of Directors of Environmental Media Awards.

== Filmography ==
=== Film ===
Year	Title	Role	Notes
1999	Arthur's Quest	Arthur	
2001	Mean People Suck	Nick	Short film
2001	Pearl Harbor	Gunner	
2001	Not Another Teen Movie	Austin	
2002	Local Boys	Randy Dobson	
2002	The Hot Chick	Jake	
2003	Dumb and Dumberer: When Harry Met Lloyd	Lloyd Christmas	
2004	Cellular	Chad Thompson	
2004	Death Valley	Josh	
2006	Beerfest	Gunther	
2006	The Last Kiss	Kenny	
2007	License to Wed	Carlisle Myers	
2007	The Comebacks	Foreign Exchange Student	
2008	Sunshine Cleaning	Randy Clever	
2008	Eagle Eye	Craig Bolston	
2009	Fired Up	Nick Brady	
2009	The Six Wives of Henry Lefay	Lloyd Wiggins	
2010	The Back-Up Plan	Clive Bennett	
2011	The Thing	Adam Finch	
2012	Celeste and Jesse Forever	Steve Tucker	
2014	Warning Labels	Thad	Short film
2015	Band of Robbers	Sid Sawyer	
2016	The Relationtrip	Chippy (voice)	
2017	Sun Dogs	Thad	
2017	Battle of the Sexes	Lornie Kuhle	
2019	The Place of No Words		

=== Television ===
Year	Title	Role	Notes
1997	Beyond Belief: Fact or Fiction	Adam	Episode: "The Viewing, The Subway, Kid in the Closet, Justice is Served & The Tractor"
1998	Black Cat Run	Gas Station Attendant	TV Movie – Credited as Eric Olsen
1999	Arthur's Quest	Artie / King Arthur	TV movie
1999	Turks	Kevin Williams	Episode: "Friends & Strangers"
1999	ER	Travis Mitchell	Episode: "Responsible Parties"
1999–2000	Get Real	Cameron Green	Main cast – 22 episodes
2000	Lessons Learned	Jack	TV movie
2001	Ruling Class	Bill Olszewski	TV movie
2001	Smallville	Young Harry Volk	Episode: "Hourglass"
2002	24	John Mason	Episode: "Day 2: 2:00 p.m.–3:00 p.m."
2005	Tru Calling	Jensen Ritchie	5 episodes (season 2)
2006–2007	The Loop	Sully Sullivan	Main cast 17 episodes
2007	Not Another High School Show	Mason Atkins	TV movie
2007	The Hill	Matt O'Brien	TV movie
2007	Write & Wrong	Jason 'Krueger' Langdon	TV movie
2008–2009	Brothers & Sisters	Kyle DeWitt	6 episodes
2009–2010	Community	Vaughn Miller	4 episodes
2010	Neighbors from Hell	Wayne (voice)	3 episodes
2010	Lego Hero Factory: Rise of the Rookies	William Furno (Voice)	Television Film
2010–2012	Kick Buttowski: Suburban Daredevil	Wade	Recurring character
2010–2012	Hero Factory	William Furno	7 episodes
2010–2023	NCIS: Los Angeles	Marty Deeks	Recurring cast (season 1); Main cast (season 2–14); Writer (season 11 episode 10 "Mother")
2011	Lego Hero Factory: Savage Planet	William Furno (voice)	Television Film
2015	House Hunters	Himself	
2015	Geeks Who Drink	Himself	Episode: "Eric Christian Olsen vs. Scott Porter"
2016	Star vs. the Forces of Evil	Rock / Whale / Additional Voices	2 episodes
2017	Ryan Hansen Solves Crimes on Television	Himself	Season 1, 2 episodes
2018	Robot Chicken	Chief Martin Brody / Basil of Baker Street / Logan 5	Episode: "Things Look Bad for the Streepster"
2020	Pete the Cat	Big Cathuna	Episode: "Super Surfboard Smash"
2024–present	Matlock		Producer/Executive Producer
2026–present	NCIS: Origins		Executive Producer

=== Music videos ===
Year	Title	Artist	Ref.
2001	"Tainted Love"	Marilyn Manson	
2008	"Yes We Can"	will.i.am and various	
2014	"Imagine" (UNICEF: World version)	Various	

== Awards and nominations ==
Young Artist Awards

- 2000: Nominated, "Best Performance in a TV Series – Young Ensemble" with Jesse Eisenberg, Kyle Gibson, Anne Hathaway in Get Real.

Teen Choice Awards

- 2003: Nominated, "Choice Movie Chemistry" with Derek Richardson in Dumb and Dumberer: When Harry Met Lloyd.

Razzie Awards

- 2003: Nominated, "Worst Screen Couple" with Derek Richardson in Dumb and Dumberer: When Harry Met Lloyd.

Prism Awards by Entertainment Industries Council

- 2014: Nominated, "Male Performance in a Drama Series Multi-Episode Storyline" in NCIS: Los Angeles.
