= Hat Rin =

Town on Ko Pha Ngan, Thailand

Haad Rin หาดริ้น
- Village
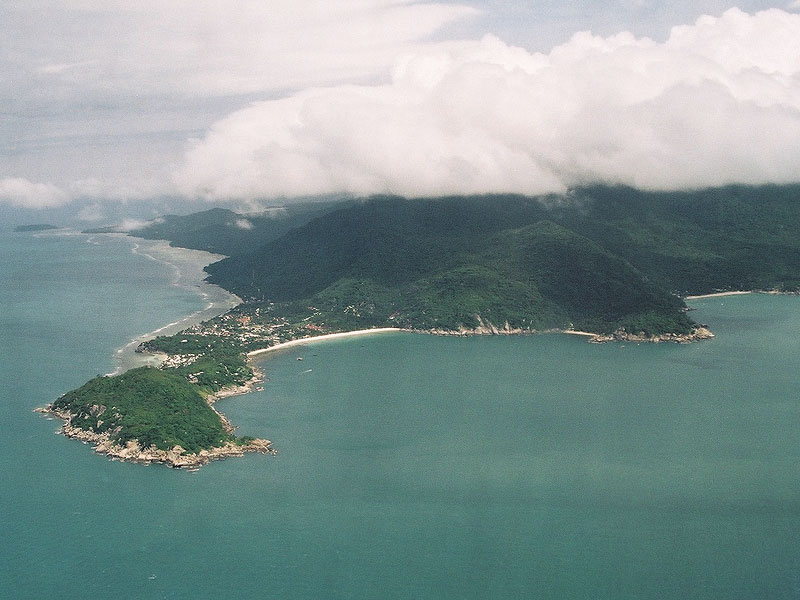
- Ko Pha-ngan. Haad Rin is the peninsula seen to the lower left.

- Location within Thailand
- Coordinates: 9.6768908°N 100.0680503°E
- Country: Thailand
- Province: Surat Thani
- District: Ko Pha-ngan
- Subdistrict: Ban Tai
- Time zone: UTC+7 (ICT)
- Postal code: 84280

Haad Rin (Thai: หาดริ้น, pronounced [hàːt rín]) is a peninsular beach area and town on the southern tip of Ko Pha-ngan, an island in the Gulf of Thailand. Its two main beaches are Sunset Beach (Haad Rin Nai) to the south and the larger Sunrise Beach (Haad Rin Nok) to the north. A Full Moon Party takes place on Sunrise Beach each month.

The town and beach first became popular for backpacker tourism in the 1980s. As the popularity of the beach and Full Moon Party have increased, the town has grown to accommodate the new visitors. The town is centered on Chicken Corner, a crossroads and popular meeting spot.

== Entertainment ==
Sunrise Beach

Most of the nightlife in the town is centered on beachfront spots. The original beach bars, Drop-In Bar and Cactus Bar, attract the largest crowds with nightly drink promotions and fire shows. Here, popular chart tunes, R&B, and club classics entertain the crowds. Other beach bars include Vinyl Club, Zoom (both playing psytrance, the original Full Moon Party style of music), Orchid (playing drum & bass and jungle), and Boom Boom Bar (playing deeper house and trance music).

=== Fire shows ===
Apart from the music and bars on the beaches of Haad Rin, a regular feature of Haad Rin is the nightly fire shows put on by individuals at the Cactus and Drop-In Bars. Various individuals specialize in the arts of Poi and staff, performing tricks to entertain the crowds. The firesticks are ropes twisted around sticks and soaked in diesel which, when burned, emits choking clouds of toxic stench. Many tourists are inspired by the shows and opt to take up daytime lessons before joining the evening fire shows.

=== Pollution ===
Haad Rin is polluted with litter as a result of the constant parties and number of visitors. There are sewage works, and the sewerage is not pumped into the sea, but there are inadequate waste management services.

== Popular culture ==
Haad Rin Beach has been featured in many media, such as the Danny Boyle film adaptation of The Beach, The Backpacker by John Harris, and songs by The Klaxons and by S-Kay.
