= Arthur's Quest (film) =

- Directed by: Neil Mandt
- Written by: Clint Hutchison; Lance Dreesen; Gregory Poppen
- Produced by: Steven Paul; Patrick Ewald
- Starring: Catherine Oxenberg; Eric Christian Olsen; Arye Gross; Alexandra Paul
- Cinematography: Anton Floquet
- Edited by: Paul Tarantino
- Music by: Erik Lundmark
- Distributed by: A-Pix; Crystal Sky Communications
- Release date: 1999
- Running time: 92 minutes
- Country: United States
- Language: English

Arthur's Quest is an American fantasy film of 1999 directed by Neil Mandt and starring Catherine Oxenberg, Eric Christian Olsen, Arye Gross, and Alexandra Paul.

In the story, Merlin rescues young Arthur from Camelot's clutches and transports him to 20th-century North America. A decade later, Arthur returns to his homeland.

Critics have noted the plot's resemblance to an inverse of Mark Twain's Connecticut Yankee.

== Plot ==
The movie begins at Camelot, depicting Morgana committing the murder of Arthur's father, Pendragon. Merlin escorts Arthur, still a young boy, along with the legendary sword Excalibur, through time to the United States during the latter part of the 20th century.

In this new setting, a waitress named Caitlin Regal takes Arthur under her wing. A decade passes, and Arthur, now a brooding teenager, forms a close bond with Caitlin and his friend Gwen. Merlin reappears to reclaim Arthur, who initially doubts his fantastical tale. However, events take a dramatic turn when Morgana also arrives, driven by her pursuit of Excalibur. Arthur sides with Merlin after Morgana kidnaps Caitlin.

Following Morgana's defeat, Merlin transports Arthur, Caitlin, and Gwen back to Camelot, where Arthur introduces the invention of the hamburger. Meanwhile, Caitlin falls in love with Merlin and assumes the role of Secretary of State.

== Cast ==
- Catherine Oxenberg as Morgana
- Eric Christian Olsen as Arthur
- Arye Gross as Merlin
- Alexandra Paul as Caitlin Regal
- Neil Mandt as Policeman
- Brion James as Trent
- Clint Howard as Whitney
- Zach Galligan as Pendragon
- Robby Seager as Arthur (small boy)
- Jf Pryor as Slagador
- Michael Oshry as Business man
- Bonnie Paul as Mrs Frays
- Katie Johnston as Gwen
- Kevin Elston as Timmy
- Diane Hill as Hilda
- Gregory Poppen as Thug
