= The Opposite Sex and How to Live with Them =

- Theatrical release poster
- Directed by: Matthew Meshekoff
- Written by: Noah Stern
- Produced by: Stanley M. Brooks; Robert F. Newmyer
- Starring: Arye Gross; Courteney Cox; Kevin Pollak; Julie Brown
- Cinematography: Jacek Laskus
- Edited by: Adam Weiss
- Music by: Ira Newborn
- Production companies: Once Upon a Time Films; Outlaw Productions
- Distributed by: Miramax Films (United States); Spelling Films International (International)
- Release dates: April 10, 1992 (Limited); November 26, 1992 (Germany); March 26, 1993 (United States)
- Running time: 86 minutes
- Country: United States
- Language: English
- Budget: $2.5 million
- Box office: $690,966

The Opposite Sex and How to Live with Them is a 1992 American romantic comedy film directed by Matthew Meshekoff and written by Noah Stern. The film stars Arye Gross, Courteney Cox, Kevin Pollak, Julie Brown, Mitchell Ryan and Mitzi McCall. The film was released on March 26, 1993, by Miramax Films.

== Plot ==
David meets Carrie at a bar where he and his friend Eli are trying to pick up girls. They seem to like each other at first glance but are reluctant to approach each other because neither seems to show much interest. Fate seems to have had other plans though because they soon meet again at a baseball game; and thanks to Carrie's friend/roommate Zoe, David gets her number and asks her out. Soon they start dating.

Throughout the story, either Eli, Zoe, David, or Carrie break the fourth wall to express their inner thoughts and feelings.

Carrie and David's relationship grows from cheap dates to spending nights at the other person's place to the formation of an emotional connection. A sexual encounter at Carrie's workplace soon leads to them being convinced by some kids that they should move in together and the two suddenly confess their love for one another. This devastates Eli as he fears losing his childhood friend.

Soon after moving into David's apartment, rigorous meetings/interrogation sessions with each other's parents take place.

Eli calls David one night and reminds him of his deep-rooted fear Of missing out as well as his fear of commitment, which results in Carrie and David growing apart and eventually leads to the two breaking up.

After they both go on dates with people they perceive to be their "perfect match", David and Carrie realize how much they miss each other and how truly in love they were, leading to their eventual patch-up.

Soon after getting back together, David and Carrie often find themselves being compared to older, married couples, with emphasis on the "married" part. This causes David to have a nightmare about Carrie marrying another man and he decides to propose to her in the same bar where they first met.

On their wedding day during two heart-to-heart conversations between the bride, groom, and their respective friends, it is revealed that Carrie has doubts about her identity after marriage and how things will change which Zoe reassures her with stories about her own life as a married woman, mother, etc. It is also revealed during the talk between David and Eli that Eli's indifference toward David's relationship was purely fueled by the worry that Carrie might not be the one David is meant to end up with and that Eli also has a desire to get married someday...with the right person of course.

The story comes to an end with Carrie and David's wedding being overseen by officiants of both the Christian and Jewish faiths.

== Cast ==
- Arye Gross as David Crown
- Courteney Cox as Carrie Davenport
- Kevin Pollak as Eli
- Julie Brown as Zoe
- Mitchell Ryan as Kenneth Davenport
- Mitzi McCall as Freida Crown
- Susan Cookson as Giselle Davenport
- Philip Bruns as Irv Crown
- Jack Carter as Rabbi
- Tess Foltyn as Hanna
- David DeCastro as Beer Vendor
- Donald Brown as Crackerjack Vendor
- Aaron Lustig as Movie Bully
- Connie Sawyer as Waitress From Hell
- Steven Brill as George/French TV Announcer
- Davis Guggenheim as Pitcher
- Craig Alan Edwards as First Baseman
- Rob Youngblood as Adam
- John DeMita as Chipper
- Lisa Waltz as Lizbeth
- Kimberlin Brown as Leeza
- Tony Canario as Cute Guy
- Kevin West as Tour Guide
- Justin Shenkarow as Buddy
- Mindy Mittleman as Cindy
- Jensen Daggett as Cheerleader
- Amanda Foreman as Waitress
- Kimber Sissons as Tracy
- Larry Poindexter as Carrie's Date
- Frank Birney as Priest
- Johnny Most as Basketball Announcer

== Reception ==
The film received negative reviews from critics. It currently holds a rating of 7% on Rotten Tomatoes based on 14 reviews.
