= Hats Off for Cancer =

American nonprofit organization

- Formation: 1996
- Founder: Tara A. Lawrence
- Purpose: Children Fighting Cancer
- Location: Calabasas, California; St. Louis, Missouri; Portland, Oregon (United States)
- Key people: Tara A. Lawrence; Eric Christian Olsen
- Website: www.hatsoff4cancer.com

Hats Off for Cancer (HOC) is a United States 501(c)(3) nonprofit organization that provides support for children affected by cancer. The signature activity of the charity is to collect donated hats for distribution to children battling cancer—especially children with alopecia resulting from their treatment. The organization estimates that it has coordinated the distribution of over 1.5 million hats since 1996.

== History ==
The organization was founded in 1996 by Tara A. Lawrence, whose grandfather died from prostate cancer in 1992. Lawrence initially volunteered with the American Cancer Society, where she was exposed to children battling cancer who were especially upset about losing their hair from chemotherapy. HOC was born when Lawrence began soliciting hat donations from companies, public officials, celebrities, schools, and civic organizations.

== Mission and structure ==
Hats Off for Cancer states its mission and purpose as "reach[ing] out to children battling cancer, to make a child's day a bit happier and their smile a bit brighter" by "distributing hats donated via generous individuals, corporations, sport teams and celebrities." HOC is an all-volunteer organization in which no person receives a salary or other compensation. The charity is governed by a board of directors that includes Tara Lawrence as founder and executive director, and actor Eric Christian Olsen as a director and spokesperson.

== Activities ==
The organization runs an annual "Mad Hatter Drive" in which schools and other organizations collect new hats and monetary donations. The HOC headquarters coordinates the distribution of most of these hats to nearby hospitals and camps that serve pediatric cancer patients. The rest of the hats are stored at HOC headquarters for distribution as individual hat requests or to global sites with an identified need. The organization also recognizes children battling cancer as "Heroes of the Week".

== Recognition ==
The organization and its founder have been recognized by a number of news organizations and talk shows. These include the Today Show, The Montel Williams Show, and The Rosie O'Donnell Show. Lawrence was named a "Hero at Home" by KTLA news in Los Angeles and "Hero of the Week" by KNX newsradio.

== Structure ==
Hats Off for Cancer is governed by a board of directors. The organization is facilitated by means of a central processing unit. Hat donations and financial contributions are received from around the globe. Organizations looking to donate hats, as well as receive hats, contact the National Hat Drive Coordinator for further assistance in holding a hat drive. Those interested in receiving hats contact the President or National Hat Drive Coordinator. The hats collected through donations or hat drives are then distributed to hospitals, camps, and organizations worldwide.

== Awards ==
Hats Off for Cancer has received awards including:

• Home Depot Hometown Hero 2009 • Charming Shoppes' Voices 2006 Award • New Jersey Joint Resolution for Prudential Spirit of Community Award • Hunterdon County Board of Chosen Freeholders Commendation • New Jersey Woman's Business Award • Youth Advocate of the Year Award – American Cancer Society • Youth Advisory Council Award • USAA National Volunteer Service Award
