= Arye Gross =

American actor (born 1960)

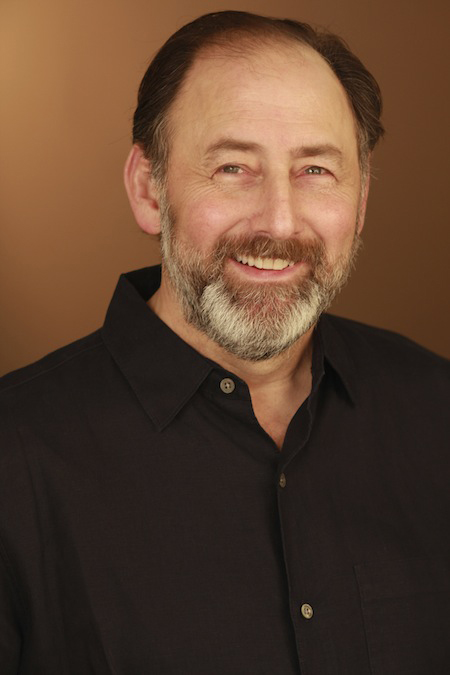
- Born: March 17, 1960 (age 66); Los Angeles, California, U.S.
- Education: University of California, Irvine
- Occupation: Actor
- Years active: 1982–present
- Spouse: Lisa Schulz (m. 1999)
- Children: 1

Arye Gross (/ˈɑːri/; born March 17, 1960) is an American actor who has appeared on a variety of television shows in numerous roles, most notably Adam Greene in the ABC sitcom Ellen.

== Personal life ==
Gross was born on March 17, 1960, in Los Angeles, California, the son of Sheri and Joseph Gross, who was an aerospace engineer and later worked in business.

He and Lisa Schulz married in 1999 and they have one daughter born in 2006.

== Education and training ==
Gross attended public school and in 1977 was accepted to the University of California Irvine to study theater. Robert Cohen, then head of UCI's Drama Department later said, "I remember him as an undergrad student actor and knew he was quite good." The following summer he was accepted in the Professional Conservatory program at South Coast Repertory (SCR) in neighboring Costa Mesa, where Lee Shallat-Chemel was then the program director. She remembered how he handled Edgar's "nonsensical" passages in King Lear during scene study. "Arye found a visceral reality and the scene became filled with pathos and meaning. And it just blew me away. I had never seen, really, any actor do that."

== Career ==
=== Stage ===
Gross was part of SCR's acting company for three years, which culminated in his role in the world premiere of L.J. Schneiderman's Screwball. Director Frank Condon invited Gross to work with Teatro Campesino under the direction of Luis Valdez, which he did for a year.

Gross appeared in a number of stage productions with a variety of companies in the Los Angeles area, including LATC, Pasadena Playhouse, Odyssey Theater Ensemble, MET Theater and Stages Theater Center. Gross' stage credits include La Bete for the Stages Theatre Center, Room Service for the Pasadena Playhouse, Three Sisters for the Los Angeles Theatre Center, Taming of the Shrew and Much Ado About Nothing for the Grove Shakespeare Festival, Troillus and Cressida for the Globe Playhouse. He performed in Georges Feydeau's Sleep, I Want You to Sleep at the Stages Theatre Company, where he served as Managing Director.

He is a member of the Antaeus Theatre Company, where he appeared in Mrs. Warren's Profession and as the title character in Uncle Vanya. His South Coast Repertory credits also include the world premieres of Richard Greenberg's Our Mother's Brief Affair, and Donald Margulies' Brooklyn Boy, which marked Gross' Broadway debut when it moved to New York. He also was in the 2016 world premiere of Eliza Clark's Future Thinking.

=== Television ===
Gross's best-known television role was on the ABC series Ellen as Adam Green for the program's first three seasons. Gross also starred in the short-lived series Citizen Baines with James Cromwell. Arye has made numerous guest appearances on a wide variety of television series, such as Diff'rent Strokes, Knight Rider, The Outer Limits, Six Feet Under, Law & Order: Special Victims Unit, Diagnosis: Murder, Friends and Law & Order: Criminal Intent. He also had a recurring role as Dr. Sidney Perlmutter on Castle.

Gross also played the adult voice of Kevin Arnold on the pilot episode of The Wonder Years when it first aired after Super Bowl XXII. However, the narration was re-recorded using Daniel Stern's voice for the pilot when it subsequently re-aired, and Stern remained the narrator through the entire run of the series.

=== Directing ===
In 1999, Gross acted in and directed The Prince and the Surfer, his film directorial debut.

== Filmography ==
=== Film ===
Year	Title	Role	Notes
1984	Exterminator 2	Turbo	film debut
1985	Just One of the Guys	Willie	
1986	Soul Man	Gordon Bloomfeld	
1987	House II: The Second Story	Jesse	
1988	The Couch Trip	Perry Kovin	
1988	Tequila Sunrise	Andy Leonard	
1989	The Experts	Wendell	
1990	A Matter of Degrees	Maxwell Glass	
1990	Coupe de Ville	Buddy Libner	
1990	Shaking the Tree	Barry	
1991	For the Boys	Jeff Brooks	
1992	A Midnight Clear	Stan Shutzer	
1992	The Opposite Sex and How to Live with Them	David Crown	
1993	Hexed	Matthew Welsh	
1994	Two Over Easy	David	Short film
1996	Mother Night	Dr. Abraham Epstein	
1996	Brittle Glory	Lewis Rosen	
1996	Timelock	Riley	
1996	The Elevator	Moshe	
1997	Tinseltown	Max	
1997	Big City Blues	Babs	
1998	Spoiler	The Attendant	
1998	Chow Bella	David Felder	
1999	Seven Girlfriends	Roman	
1999	The Prince and the Surfer	Vince	Also director
1999	Arthur's Quest	Merlin	
2000	Big Eden	Henry Hart	
2000	Gone in Sixty Seconds	James Lakewood	
2001	Burning Down the House	Bob Washington	
2001	Accidents Don't Happen	Tommy	
2002	Minority Report	Howard Marks	
2008	Jim and Jung	Carl	Short film
2010	Midlife	Sam	Short film
2010	Harvest	Benny Monopoli	
2011	The Healer	Dr. Williams	Short film
2011	Lone	Pops	Short film
2011	In Mexico	Jason	Short film
2012	Atlas Shrugged: Part II	Ken Danagger	
2012	Commencement	Nate	
2016	Diani & Devine Meet the Apocalypse	Clovis	
2017	The Lady Killers	Dan Casey	
2018	Nostalgia	Riley O'Bryan	
2018	Health to the King	Doctor	Short film
2019	First Love	Richard Crest	

=== Television ===
Year	Title	Role	Notes
1982	Diff'rent Strokes	Marko	television debut Episode: "The Peacemaker"
1983	American Playhouse	Congregation	Episode: "Miss Lonelyhearts"
1985	Knight Rider	Elliott Skyes	Episode: "Knight & Knerd"
1986	Remington Steele	Albert Wellington	Episode: "Steele at Your Service"
1986	Heart of the City	Otis	Episode: "Cold Steal and Neon"
1987	Into the Homeland	Joel Bessman	Television movie
1988	The Wonder Years	Kevin Arnold (The Narrator)	voice; uncredited Episode: "Pilot"
1992	Boris and Natasha	Bellhop	Television movie
1994	Confessions: Two Faces of Evil	Jay Jaffe	Television movie
1994–1996	Ellen	Adam Green	series regular; 42 episodes
1995	Santo Bugito	Tad/Venus Fly Trap	voice Episode: "My Name Is Revenge"
1995	Friends	Michael	Episode: "The One Where Ross Finds Out"
1996	The Single Guy	Tony	Episode: "Best Man"
1996	The Real Adventures of Jonny Quest	Matthees/Pilot	voice Episode: "DNA Doomsday"
1997	Duckman: Private Duck/Family Man	Bobby	voice Episode: "With Friends Like These"
1997	The Player	unknown role	Television movie
1997–1998	Profiler	Greg Hayes	2 episodes
1997–2002	The Practice	Rabbi Daniel Warner/Walter Beck's Attorney	5 episodes
1998	Michael Hayes	Lane	Episode: "Arise and Fall"
1998	Cybill	Director	Episode: "Fine Is Not a Feeling"
1998	The Outer Limits	Bernard Selden	Episode: "Fear Itself"
1998	Rugrats	Attendant/Bear	voice Episode: "Uneasy Rider/Where's Grandpa?"
1998	Diagnosis: Murder	Carter Sweeney	recurring role; 4 episodes
1998	Millennium	Ed	Episode: "Skull and Bones"
1999	Fantasy Island	Jeremy Slater	Episode: "Heroes"
1999	Arthur's Quest	Merlin	Television movie
1999	Get Real	Dr. Larry Keehan	2 episodes
1999	In the Company of Spies	Todd Simar	Television movie
2000	Martial Law	Agent Randall Wicke	Episode: "Freefall"
2000	Just Shoot Me!	Ben	Episode: "With Thee I Swing"
2000	Good vs Evil	Orson Williamson	Episode: "Wonderful Life"
2000	Chicken Soup for the Soul	Adam	Episode: "The Final Show"
2000	Once and Again	Todd Monroe	Episode: "Ozymandias 2.0"
2000	Citizen Baines	Shel Eidenberg	unknown episode
2000–2004	Judging Amy	Attorney Zahmber/Scott Zomber	2 episodes
2001	The X-Files	Dr. Tom Puvogel	Episode: "Salvage"
2001	Touched by an Angel	John Baker	Episode: "Bringer of Light"
2001	ER	Kevin	Episode: "April Showers"
2002	Strong Medicine	Gene Withers	Episode: "Outcomes"
2002	John Doe	Dr. Jansen	Episode: "Doe Re: Me"
2003	Six Feet Under	Frank Muehler	3 episodes
2003	The West Wing	Obstetrician	Episode: "Commencement"
2003	The Lyon's Den	Edgar Haight	Episode: "The Fifth"
2003–2012	CSI: Crime Scene Investigation	Vincent Demarcus/Paul Winston	2 episodes
2004	The Guardian	Mr. Tilden	Episode: "All Is Mended"
2004	Without a Trace	Charles Potter	Episode: "Lost and Found"
2005–2006	Wildfire	Charlie Hewitt	series regular; 12 episodes
2005	Law & Order: Criminal Intent	Hubert Skoller	Episode: "No Exit"
2005	Three Wise Guys	Leo	Television movie
2006	Grey's Anatomy	Adam Morris	Episode: "Oh, the Guilt"
2007–2008	The Riches	Pete Mincey	4 episodes
2007	Mystery Woman: In the Shadows	Jonathan Stansfield	Television movie
2007	Numb3rs	Professor Stanley Novich	Episode: "Contenders"
2007	Medium	Cooper Conroy	3 episodes
2007	Burn Notice	Perry Clark	Episode: "Hard Bargain"
2007	Law & Order: Special Victims Unit	Saul Picard	Episode: "Blinded"
2008	CSI: NY	Wallace Carver/Frank Moore	Episode: "Admissions"
2008	Cold Case	Oscar Anderson '81	Episode: "The Dealer"
2009	The Ghost Whisperer	Edwin Hathaway	Episode: "Body of Water"
2009	Grey Gardens	Albert Maysles	Television movie
2009	Dollhouse	Professor Gossen	Episode: "Belle Chose"
2009–2016	Castle	M.E. Sidney Perlmutter	recurring role; 17 episodes
2010–2011	The Defenders	Bennie B. Hapwood	2 episodes
2010	Proposition 8 Trial Re-Enactment	Dr. Ilan Meyer	Television documentary
2010	Leverage	Larry Duberman	Episode: "The Reunion Job"
2010	The Mentalist	Dr. Saban	Episode: "Pink Chanel Suit"
2010	Lie to Me	Dr. Hamill	Episode: "Veronica"
2011	Second City This Week	Celebrity Guest	unknown
2011	The Protector	Dr. Nolan Miller	Episode: "Revisions"
2011	Fringe	Malcolm Truss	Episode: "Novation"
2015	Criminal Minds	Donnie Mallick	Episode: "Nelson's Sparrow"
2017	Designated Survivor	Elias Grandi	Episode: "One Year In"
2018	MacGyver	Dr. Isaac Herman	Episode: "UFO + Area 51"
2019	GLOW	Gene	Episode: "Desert Pollen"
2020	How to Get Away with Murder	Connor's Lawyer	Episode: "We're Not Getting Away with It"
2022	The Rookie	Professor Meadows	Episode: "Simone"
2022	Better Call Saul	Judge Gabriel Dearden	Episode: "Fun and Games"
2022	Dahmer – Monster: The Jeffrey Dahmer Story	Gerald Boyle	Episode: "Lionel"
2022	9-1-1	Nathan Levinson	Episode: "Crash & Learn"
