= Arthur Frommer =

American travel writer (1929–2024)

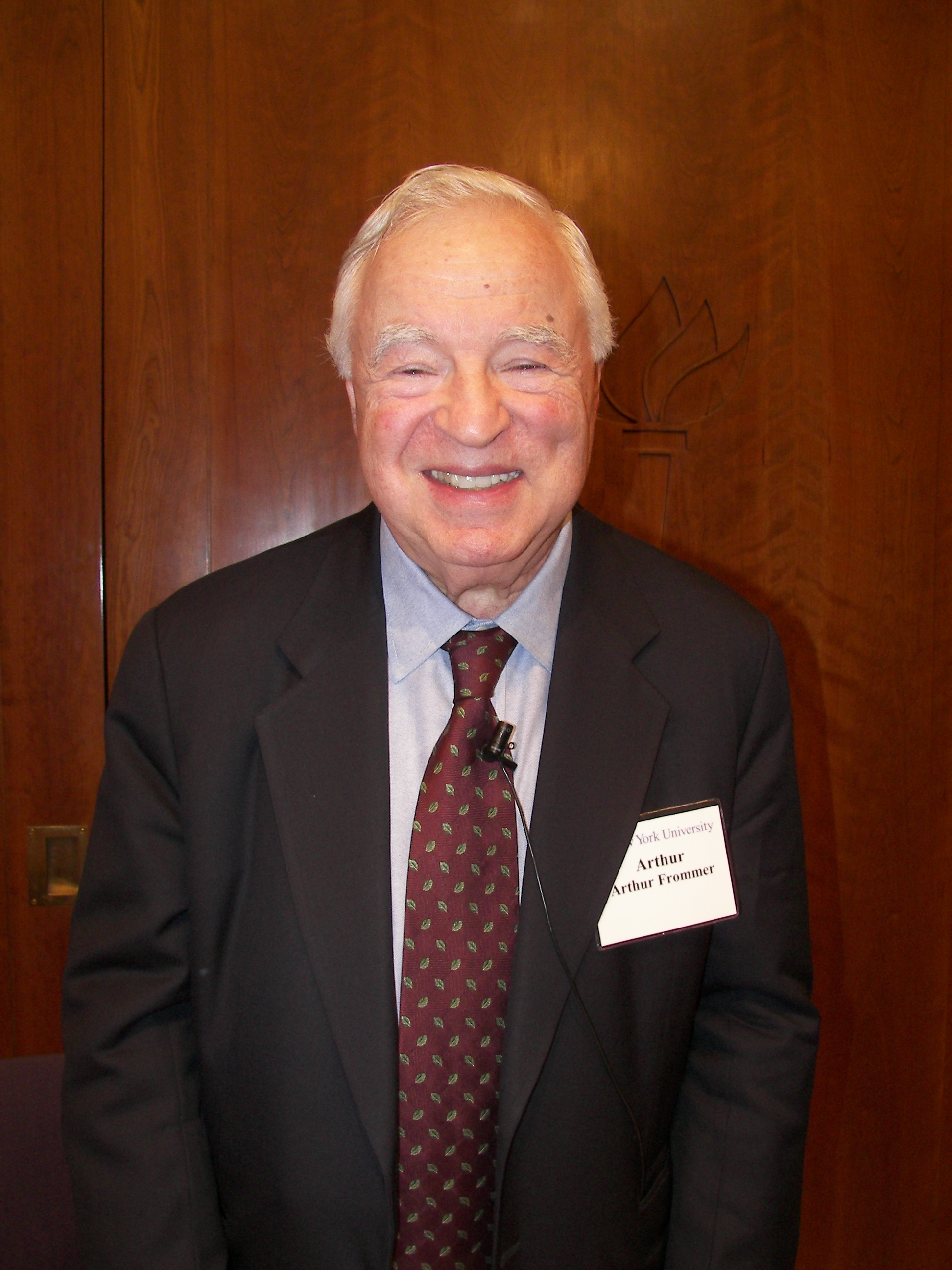
- Frommer in 2007
- Born: Arthur Bernard Frommer; July 17, 1929; Lynchburg, Virginia, U.S.
- Died: November 18, 2024 (aged 95); New York City, U.S.
- Education: New York University; Yale Law School
- Occupation: Travel writer
- Spouse(s): Hope Arthur (divorced) Roberta Brodfeld (m. 1994)
- Children: Pauline Frommer
- Writing career
- Genres: Travel Guides, Consumer Advocacy
- Website: frommers.com

Arthur Bernard Frommer (/ˈfroʊmər/) (July 17, 1929 – November 18, 2024) was an American travel writer known for founding the Frommer's brand of travel guides.

== Early life ==
Arthur Bernard Frommer was born on July 17, 1929, in Lynchburg, Virginia, the son of Pauline (Abrams) and Nathan Frommer. His parents were Jewish immigrants, his father from Austria and his mother from Poland. He spent his earliest years in Jefferson City, Missouri, before he and his family moved to New York City when he was 14. He attended Erasmus Hall High School in Brooklyn, and went on to New York University in 1950 with a political science degree. He graduated with honors from Yale Law School, where he was an editor of the Yale Law Journal, in 1953.

== Career ==
Frommer was drafted into the United States Army during the Korean War. Rather than being sent to Korea, he was sent to Europe because of his linguistic abilities. In 1955, while serving in Germany, Frommer wrote and self-published a guidebook called The GI's Guide to Traveling In Europe. It sold out its first print run.

In 1957, Frommer followed up with a civilian version called Europe on 5 Dollars a Day, which covered major European urban destinations. It became one of the best selling travel guides of all time. For five years, Frommer practiced law and expanded his guidebook publishing empire. As a lawyer, he worked at Paul, Weiss, Rifkind, Wharton and Garrison and was involved with water rights cases in the American West, as well as defending D.H. Lawrence's controversial novel Lady Chatterley's Lover against the U.S. Post Office (a benchmark First Amendment case). In 1962, Frommer founded tour operator $5-a-Day Tours, Inc. He also left the practice of law in 1961 to pursue his travel business, Arthur Frommer International, Inc., of which he was chairman and president until 1981.

Frommer's writing was not restricted to travel. His The Bible and the Public Schools (1963) was a defense of that year's Supreme Court decision banning compulsory Bible reading in public schools. His Goldwater From A to Z (1964) was an argument against the Republican presidential candidate Barry Goldwater in the 1964 United States presidential election.

In 1969, Frommer built a hotel in Amsterdam, now known as the Hotel Mercure Amsterdam Arthur Frommer, and part of the Accor group. In total, Frommer built four Arthur Frommer hotels (in Aruba, Curacao, Copenhagen, and Amsterdam).

Frommer sold the travel guide book business to Simon & Schuster in 1977, it changed hands a few times, and Frommer eventually reacquired the rights in 2012.

In the 1980s, he published Frommer's New World of Travel, which advocated alternative vacation styles, and founded Budget Travel magazine, which he sold to Newsweek. He briefly ventured into general bargain shopping in 2005–2006 with the quarterly magazine Arthur Frommer's Smart Shopping. He wrote a travel column syndicated through King Features Syndicate for over 2 decades. He had a weekly syndicated radio show for over 20 years, The Travel Show with Arthur and Pauline Frommer, also hosted with his daughter Pauline (from his first marriage), co-president of Frommer Media LLC.

In 1997, Arthur Frommer was brought on by publisher IDG (later known as Hungry Minds) to create Frommers.com. It became one of the first travel sites on the web and it remains one of the top sources for unbiased, journalistically created travel information on the internet, receiving millions of page views per month.

Over the decades, over 75 million Frommer's guidebooks have been sold.

== Personal life and death ==
After Frommer's marriage to Hope Arthur ended in divorce, he married Roberta Brodfield in 1994. He had one daughter and two stepdaughters. He died of complications from pneumonia at his home on Manhattan's Upper West Side on November 18, 2024, at the age of 95.
