= Rich Eisen =

American sports television journalist (born 1969)

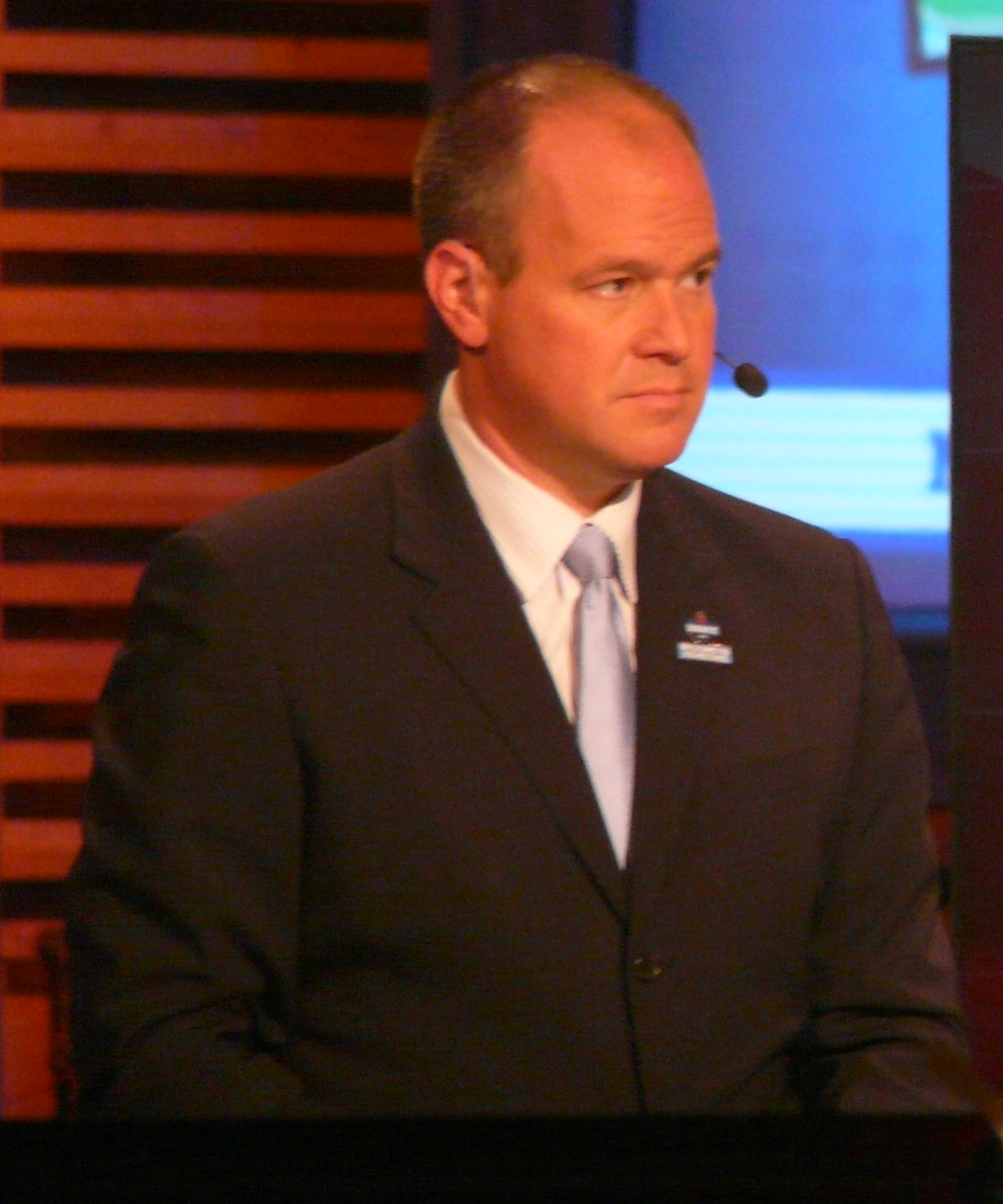
- Eisen in 2011
- Born: June 24, 1969 (age 57); New York City, U.S.
- Education: University of Michigan (BA); Northwestern University (MS)
- Occupation: Sportscaster
- Spouse: Suzy Shuster (m. 2003)
- Children: 3
- Website: richeisenshow.com

Richard Eisen (/ˈaɪzən/ EYE-zən; born June 24, 1969) is an American television sportscaster and radio host. Since 2003, he has worked for NFL Network as a host of various pregame, halftime, and postgame shows and doing occasional play-by-play. He also hosts a daily sports radio show and podcast, The Rich Eisen Show. From 1996 to 2003, he worked at ESPN, most prominently as an anchor of SportsCenter. He returned to the company in 2025 following a merger between NFL Network and ESPN.

== Early life and education ==
Eisen was born in the Brooklyn borough of New York City, and was raised on Staten Island, New York City.

Eisen attended the University of Michigan, where he served as co–sports editor of the school's Michigan Daily and was a member of the Pi Kappa Phi fraternity. He graduated in 1990 with a Bachelor of Arts degree. In 1994, he earned a Master of Science degree in journalism from the Medill School of Journalism at Northwestern University.

== Broadcasting career ==
=== Early years (1990–1996) ===
Eisen was first a staff writer for the Staten Island Advance from 1990 to 1993, and the Chicago Tribune in 1993 and 1994. He was then a sports anchor and reporter at KRCR-TV in Redding, California, from 1994 to 1996, and also worked in television as the Medill News Service's Washington correspondent (1994).

=== ESPN (1996–2003) ===
Before working for the NFL Network, he worked for ESPN. He was part of a duo with Stuart Scott, where he became well known for his humor, most notably his impressions of Atlanta Braves broadcaster Skip Caray, and provided interviews during the Home Run Derby. Eisen was also the host of ESPN's reality series, Beg, Borrow & Deal. For ESPN Radio, he served as host of Major League Baseball on ESPN Radio and as a guest host on The Tony Kornheiser Show and The Dan Patrick Show. Outside of the world of sports, Eisen hosted the ABC show Domino Day.

Among Eisen's notable achievements while at ESPN was breaking the news of St. Louis slugger Mark McGwire's retirement from baseball in 2001 on SportsCenter. Days later, he sat down with McGwire for an exclusive interview elaborating on the decision.

=== NFL Network (2003–present) ===
Rich Eisen was the first on-air talent added to the NFL Network roster in June 2003. He was the main host of NFL Total Access, the network's flagship program, until August 2011. Eisen signed a new long-term deal with NFL Network in 2010 and became the new host of NFL GameDay Morning, the first pregame show on the NFL Network. Eisen also remains host of NFL GameDay Highlights, as well as NFL Network's Thursday Night Football pregame, halftime and postgame shows and special on-location coverage from league events such as Kickoff, Pro Football Hall of Fame, NFL Scouting Combine, NFL draft and Super Bowl.

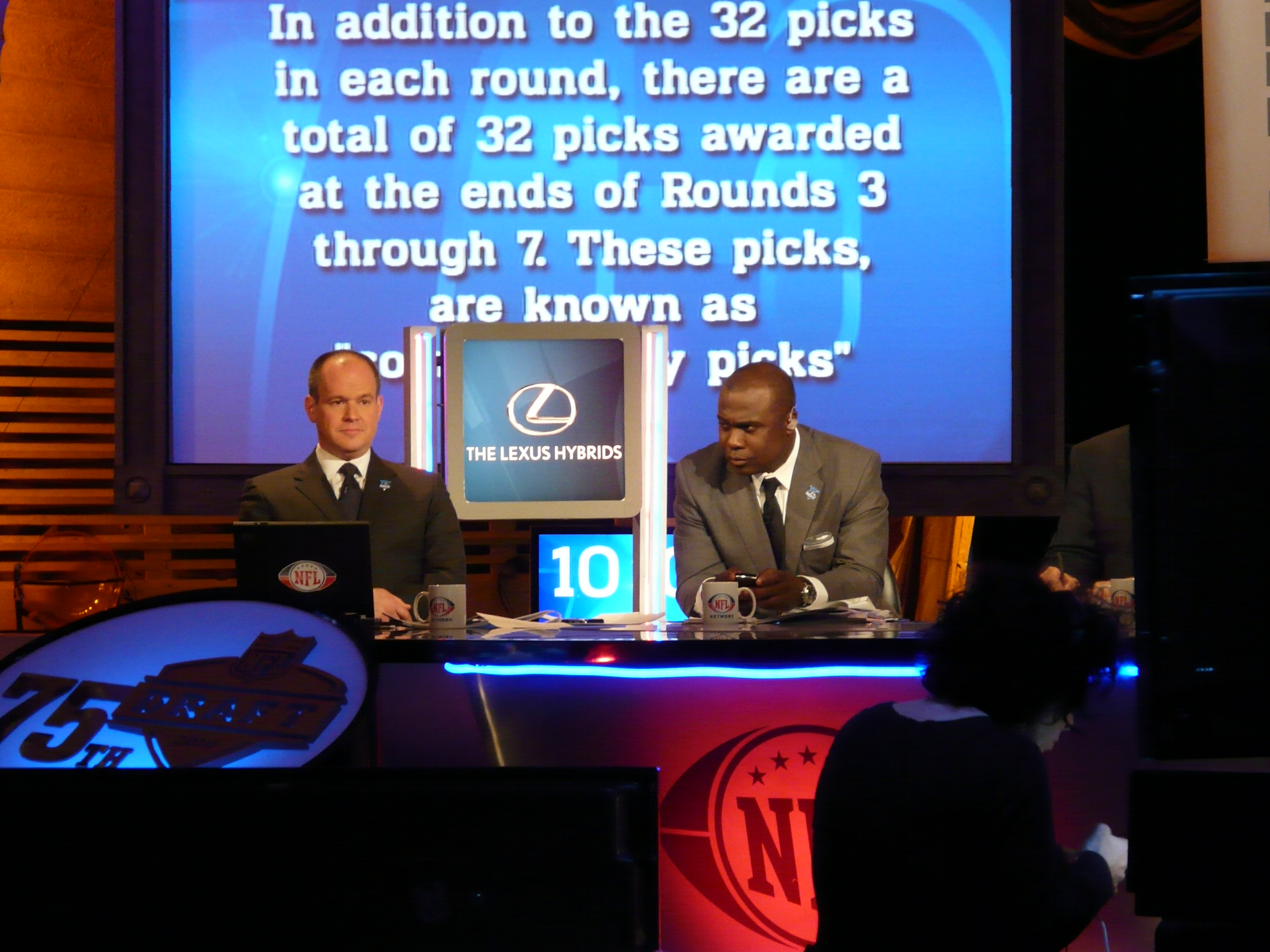
Eisen (left) and Marshall Faulk during the 2010 NFL draft

Eisen expanded his résumé in 2010 with the debut of "The Rich Eisen Podcast," the first-ever podcast for NFL.com. The weekly podcast, available on Apple Podcasts among many other sources, features guests from the world of sports and entertainment news talking football and all the latest headlines. Since its debut, the podcast has been downloaded more than seven million times and celebrated its 200th episode. Eisen hosts his nationally syndicated sports talk radio show with Chris Brockman, Michael Del Tufo, and TJ Jefferson.

In November 2012, Eisen's first Thanksgiving Special aired on the NFL Network with a variety of celebrity guests talking mostly sports and current events.

In 2005, Terrell Davis challenged Eisen to compete in the 40-yard dash at the NFL Scouting Combine.

Eisen runs it annually, wearing a suit, and his times are:

2005	2006	2007	2008	2009	2010	2011	2012	2013	2014	2015	2016	2017	2018	2019	2020	2021	2022	2023	2024	2025
6.77	6.22	6.43	6.34	6.34	6.21	6.18	6.03	6.03	5.98	6.10	5.94	6.02	5.97	6.00	5.98	6.03	6.16	6.22	6.25	6.47

That makes his best time 5.94, in 2016.

Eisen turned his annual sprint into a charitable campaign "#RunRichRun" which raises money for St. Jude Children's Research Hospital. His campaign has raised over $5.2 million and for his work he was honored with the 2017 Pat Summerall Award. A graphic based on one of his runs is the trademark of his weekday radio and television talk show.

=== The Rich Eisen Show (2014–present) ===
On October 6, 2014, Eisen began a new sportstalk TV/radio show, The Rich Eisen Show. The show was broadcast live from DirecTV's El Segundo, California Studios on Audience Network and NFL Now.

On November 3, 2014, the show was picked up by Fox Sports Radio and broadcast daily from noon to 3 p.m. ET. Eisen took over the slot from Jay Mohr, who moved to the 3–6 p.m. slot.

In early March 2020, the show's broadcast moved from Audience to YouTube due to the impending shutdown of Audience. NBCSN and eventually NBC's streaming service Peacock picked up the show later in 2020. (At the same time as the YouTube switch, the radio version moved to Westwood One; it moved again to NBC Sports Radio, which Westwood One distributed and which transitioned in 2020 to SiriusXM as NBC Sports Audio.) The program moved again, to The Roku Channel in September 2022.

When the show moved to The Roku Channel, it also moved to a new location on SiriusXM satellite radio and Internet streaming, after several years on NBC Sports Audio; it is now available on Sirius 216, XM 202, and SXM app channel 992.

In 2022, the show was nominated for the Outstanding Studio Show Sports Emmy Award.

=== Return to ESPN (2025–present) ===
In May 2025, reports surfaced that Eisen was nearing a deal to move The Rich Eisen Show from Roku to ESPN Radio, later confirmed by ESPN. Officially announced in July 2025, the audio show moved to ESPN Radio's 12:00 pm ET slot starting on September 2, 2025. The video show is streamed on ESPN+, Disney+, and ESPN's direct-to-consumer streaming service.

As a part of his deal to return to ESPN, he will make appearances on other parts of the platform. On August 18, 2025, he made his first appearance as a SportsCenter anchor since 2003, hosting a retro-themed show alongside Mina Kimes and honoring Stuart Scott, who had died on January 4, 2015. Eisen's show is also simulcasted on ESPN during the College Football Playoff replacing The Pat McAfee Show when Pat McAfee is on site for the 2025-26 college football playoff.

On April 8, 2026, it was announced that Eisen would eventually return to Bristol, Connecticut to host a special edition of SportsCenter on Sunday, April 12, for the first time inside ESPN’s headquarters campus since his departure from the network on May 28, 2003. His regular weekday show, however, continues to be produced (by his namesake production company) from the El Segundo studios.

=== Other media ===
Eisen was the host of the TNT original reality series, The Great Escape, which debuted on June 24, 2012, and was cancelled in October 2012.

In 2012 and 2014, Eisen appeared as himself on two episodes of The League.

In 2014, Eisen appeared as himself in the film Draft Day.

From 2015 to 2017, Eisen had a recurring role as himself on the CBS sitcom The Odd Couple, playing the archrival of fictional sports radio personality Oscar Madison (played by Matthew Perry).

Since 2016, Eisen has appeared on multiple episodes of Comedy Central's TV series @midnight. In February 2018, Eisen co-hosted, with Rebecca Romijn, The American Rescue Dog Show on The Hallmark Channel.

In 2020, Eisen and The Rich Eisen Show are featured on Madden NFL 21: Face of The Franchise.

In 2022, Eisen was as guest star in five episodes of the Disney TV series The Mighty Ducks: Game Changers.

In 2024, Eisen and his show were featured by Jerry Seinfeld and Colin Jost in a comedy bit on Saturday Night Live's Weekend Update. Shortly after, Eisen did an introduction for The Roast of Tom Brady on Netflix.

== Personal life ==
Eisen is Jewish. In 2003, Eisen married Suzy Shuster, formerly a college football sideline reporter for ESPN on ABC. They have two sons and a daughter, as well as two Golden Retriever rescue dogs. They live near Coldwater Canyon in Beverly Hills, California.

Eisen wrote the book Total Access, which was published in 2007. In 2012, he started the "Punters Are People Too" movement after Bryan Anger was drafted by the Jacksonville Jaguars in the third round of the 2012 NFL draft.
