= Suzy Shuster =

American broadcaster (born 1971/72)

- Born: 1971 or 1972 (age 53–54)
- Education: Columbia University (BA)
- Occupation: Sportscaster
- Spouse: Rich Eisen (m. 2003)
- Children: 3

Suzy Shuster (born 1971 or 1972) is an American sportscaster, whose work has appeared on ABC Sports, ESPN, Turner Sports, FOX Sports and HBO.

== Education ==
Shuster attended high school at the Winsor School before graduating from Columbia University with a degree in History and Art History in 1994. At Columbia, she had historian Kenneth T. Jackson as her academic advisor.

== Career timeline ==
- Producer, ESPN's SportsCenter (1997–1998)
- Producer, Real Sports with Bryant Gumbel (1998–1999)
- Reporter/anchor, FSN West (2000–2002)
- Reporter, NBA TV (2004–2005)
- Sideline reporter, NBA on TNT playoffs coverage (2004–2005)
- Sideline reporter, College Football on ABC (2004–2005)
- host/reporter, Trojan Radio Network (2003–2009)
- Sports contributor, The Huffington Post (2011–2017)
- Fill-in host, The Rich Eisen Show (2014–present)
- Co-host, What the Football podcast, with Amy Trask (2023–present)

== Personal life ==
Shuster is married to NFL Network anchor Rich Eisen. Shuster and Eisen have three children.
