= Kimberlin Brown =

American actress (born 1961)

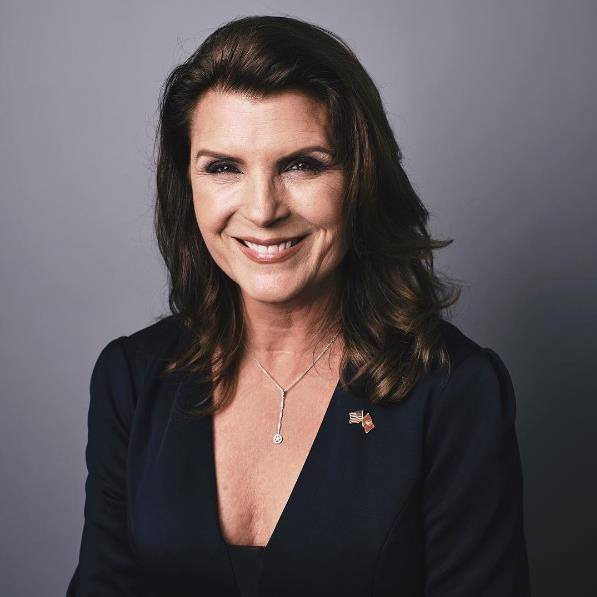
- Born: Kimberlin Ann Brown; June 29, 1961 (age 65); Hayward, California, U.S.
- Education: Grossmont High School; Grossmont College
- Occupations: Actress; model
- Years active: 1984–present
- Known for: Sheila Carter on The Young and the Restless and The Bold and the Beautiful
- Political party: Republican
- Spouse: Gary Pelzer (m. 1991)
- Children: 2
- Awards: Soap Opera Digest Award for Outstanding Villainess in a Drama Series - Daytime

Kimberlin Ann Brown (born June 29, 1961) is an American actress, business owner, and politician. She portrayed Sheila Carter on the CBS daytime soap operas The Young and the Restless (1990 to 1992, 2005 to 2006) and The Bold and the Beautiful (off and on from 1992 to the present). She received a Daytime Emmy Award nomination for Outstanding Supporting Actress for her role as Sheila on The Young and the Restless in 1993 and was nominated in the same category for The Bold and the Beautiful in 2022.

== Early life ==
Brown was born in Hayward, California, and raised in La Mesa, near San Diego. Her parents divorced when she was in junior high school. She enjoyed spending summers at her grandparents' ranch in Northern California. She attended Grossmont High School and Grossmont College.

== Career ==
=== 1979-1989: Early work ===
In 1979, Brown entered the Miss La Mesa pageant on a dare. To her surprise, she won. She was named first runner up in the Miss California pageant later that year. Brown caught the attention of Nina Blanchard, a modeling agent who judged the pageant. Blanchard signed her as a client and soon after, she was modeling in Tokyo, Milan, and Paris.

Unsatisfied with modeling, Brown became interested in acting. She made her television debut in an episode of the ABC series Fantasy Island. She then went on to guest star on Matt Houston, T.J. Hooker, and Hawaiian Heat. Her early film credits include Eye of the Tiger, Who's That Girl,18 Again!, and Back to School. Brown had a brief role on Capitol in 1987.

=== 1990-2003: Y&R and B&B ===
Brown had a short term role on Santa Barbara in 1990. She was then cast as Sheila Carter on the CBS soap opera The Young and the Restless (after originally auditioning for the role of Cassandra Rawlins). In 1992, it was announced that her character, Sheila, would move to The Bold and the Beautiful. She received a 1993 Daytime Emmy Award nomination as Outstanding Supporting Actress for playing Sheila on The Young and the Restless. She continued to play the role on The Bold and the Beautiful until 1998.

She had a role in the 1992 film The Opposite Sex and How to Live with Them and guest starred on Diagnosis Murder in 1997.

Brown had a short term role as Shelly Clark on the NBC soap opera Another World in 1999. She then joined the cast of the ABC soap opera Port Charles as Rachel Locke, from July 1999 to November 2000. She made return appearances to the show in 2001 and 2002. Brown and her Port Charles co-star, Nolan North, guest starred in two episodes of Six Feet Under, playing soap opera actors.

In 2003, Brown appeared in the film Becoming Marty. She then returned to The Bold and the Beautiful, once again playing Sheila Carter.

=== 2004-2008: One Life to Live, Return to Y&R ===
After a brief return to B&B, she was cast in the recurring role of Dr. Paige Miller on the ABC soap opera One Life to Live in October 2004. The role was originally intended for Mary Beth Evans, who turned it down when she decided to stay on As the World Turns. When Brown was offered a contract, she decided to leave, not pleased with the salary offered or the possibility of relocating to New York. She continued to air on One Life to Live until July 2005.

In 2005, Brown returned as Sheila on The Young and the Restless after a long absence from the show. In early 2006, she was released from her contract on The Young and the Restless. When her character returned later that year, the role was played by Michelle Stafford, because Sheila had undergone plastic surgery to look like Stafford's character, Phyllis Summers.

Brown had a role in the 2008 film, Proud American.

=== 2010-present ===
Brown was asked to return to The Young and the Restless early in 2010 for a storyline that was subsequently dropped. She took on a short-term role on All My Children in October 2010, playing the Judge who presided over David Hayward's murder trial.

In 2011, Brown was cast in Gregori J. Martin's web-series The Bay. She first appeared in a summer special, Far From The Bay, and continued on in the series' second season. She starred in a short film, The Necklace, and co-starred with Tom Sizemore in the 2013 film Five Hour Friends.

In June 2017, it was announced that Brown would return to The Bold and the Beautiful as Sheila. That same year, she joined the cast of The Rich and the Ruthless, a comedic series written and produced by her former The Young and the Restless co-star, Victoria Rowell.

After departing The Bold and the Beautiful in 2018, Brown returned once again as Sheila in 2021. She received a 2022 Daytime Emmy Award nomination as Outstanding Supporting Actress for her role as Sheila. Her storyline seemed to reach a final conclusion in 2024, when Sheila was stabbed to death by Steffy Forrester. Brown confirmed that Sheila was really dead. It was soon announced that Sheila was still alive, because Steffy had stabbed her look alike, Sugar, instead.

== Politics ==
Brown is a Republican. In 2016, Brown was a speaker at the 2016 Republican National Convention on the night Donald Trump was officially nominated as the party's candidate for President of the United States. After her speech, Brown got extremely emotional to Fox Business Network over what her vocal support for Donald Trump and his policies might do to her career and the treatment she had received since it was announced she would be a speaker at the convention.

In October 2017, Brown formally announced her candidacy as a Republican for California's 36th congressional district, challenging Democrat Raul Ruiz in the November 2018 election. She lost the election, receiving 41% of the vote to Ruiz's 59%.

== Personal life ==
Brown met her husband, Gary Pelzer, when she was thirteen and he was twenty-two. They began a relationship when she was eighteen, but eventually broke up. They reunited in 1990 and married on May 11, 1991. They have a daughter and a son. They became grandparents in 2024.

Her daughter, Alexes Marie Pelzer, guest starred on The Bold and the Beautiful in 2022.

Brown and Pelzer are small-business owners; they own and run an avocado farm in California. Brown also has a design business, K. Brown Design, which she launched in 2006.

She is a skier and an avid golfer. In 2014, Brown became an International Ambassador for Project Golf, a non-profit that helps underprivileged youth play golf.

== Filmography ==
=== Film ===
Year	Title	Role	Notes
1986	Back to School	Girl in Dorm Hallway	
1986	Eye of the Tiger	Dawn	
1987	Who's That Girl	Rachel	
1988	18 Again!	Receptionist	
1992	The Opposite Sex and How to Live with Them	Leeza	
2003	Becoming Marty	Linda	
2008	Proud American	Lisa	
2011	The Necklace	Margaret	Short film
2012	Just an American	Lisa	
2013	5 Hour Friends	Carla Bianchi	

=== Television ===
Year	Title	Role	Notes
1984	Fantasy Island	Model	Episode: "Don Juan's Last Affair/Final Adieu"
1984	Hawaiian Heat	Leslie	Episode: "Picture Imperfect"
1985	T. J. Hooker	Hostage	Episode: "Funny Money"
1987	Capitol	Danny	Recurring role
1990	Santa Barbara	Candace Durrell/Danielle Steele	Series regular
1990	Dragnet	Lauren James	Episode: "The Book"
1990	The New Adam-12	Woman	Episode: "Neighbors"
1990–1995, 2005–2006	The Young and the Restless	Sheila Carter (1990–1995, 2005–2006); Janet "Sugar" Webber (2005–2006)	Series regular Soap Opera Digest Award for Outstanding Villainess in a Drama Series – Daytime (1993, 1995); Nominated — Daytime Emmy Award for Outstanding Supporting Actress in a Drama Series (1993)
1992–1998, 2002–2003, 2017–2018, 2021–present	The Bold and the Beautiful	Sheila Carter (1992–1998, 2002–2003, 2017–2018, 2021–present); Janet "Sugar" Webber (2024)	Series regular Soap Opera Digest Award for Outstanding Villainess in a Drama Series – Daytime (1993); Nominated — Soap Opera Digest Award for Outstanding Villainess in a Drama Series – Daytime (1994, 1996–1997)
1997	Diagnosis: Murder	Barbara Bennings	Episode: "Delusions of Murder"
1999	Another World	Shelly Clark	Recurring role
1999–2002	Port Charles	Rachel Reese Locke	Series regular
1999–2002	General Hospital	Rachel Reese Locke	Recurring role
2003	Six Feet Under	Soap actress	Episodes: "I'm Sorry, I'm Lost" and "Perfect Circles"
2004–2005	One Life to Live	Paige Miller	Recurring role
2010	All My Children	Judge Mariam	Recurring role
2011	The Bay	Grace Drum	Episode: "Far from the Bay Part 8"
2018	The Rich and the Ruthless	Dr. Maya Cooper	Main cast (season 2)

== Awards and nominations ==
Year	Award	Category	Nominated work	Result	Ref.
1993	20th Daytime Emmy Awards	Daytime Emmy Award for Outstanding Supporting Actress in a Drama Series	Sheila Carter on The Young and the Restless	Nominated	
1993	Soap Opera Digest Awards	Soap Opera Digest Award for Outstanding Villainess in a Drama Series - Daytime	Sheila Carter on The Young and the Restless and The Bold and the Beautiful	Won	
1995	Soap Opera Digest Awards	Soap Opera Digest Award for Outstanding Villainess in a Drama Series - Daytime	Sheila Carter on The Bold and the Beautiful	Won	
2022	49th Daytime Emmy Awards	Daytime Emmy Award for Outstanding Supporting Actress in a Drama Series	Sheila Carter on The Bold and the Beautiful	Nominated	
