= Full Moon Party =

Monthly beach party in Ko Pha-ngan, Thailand

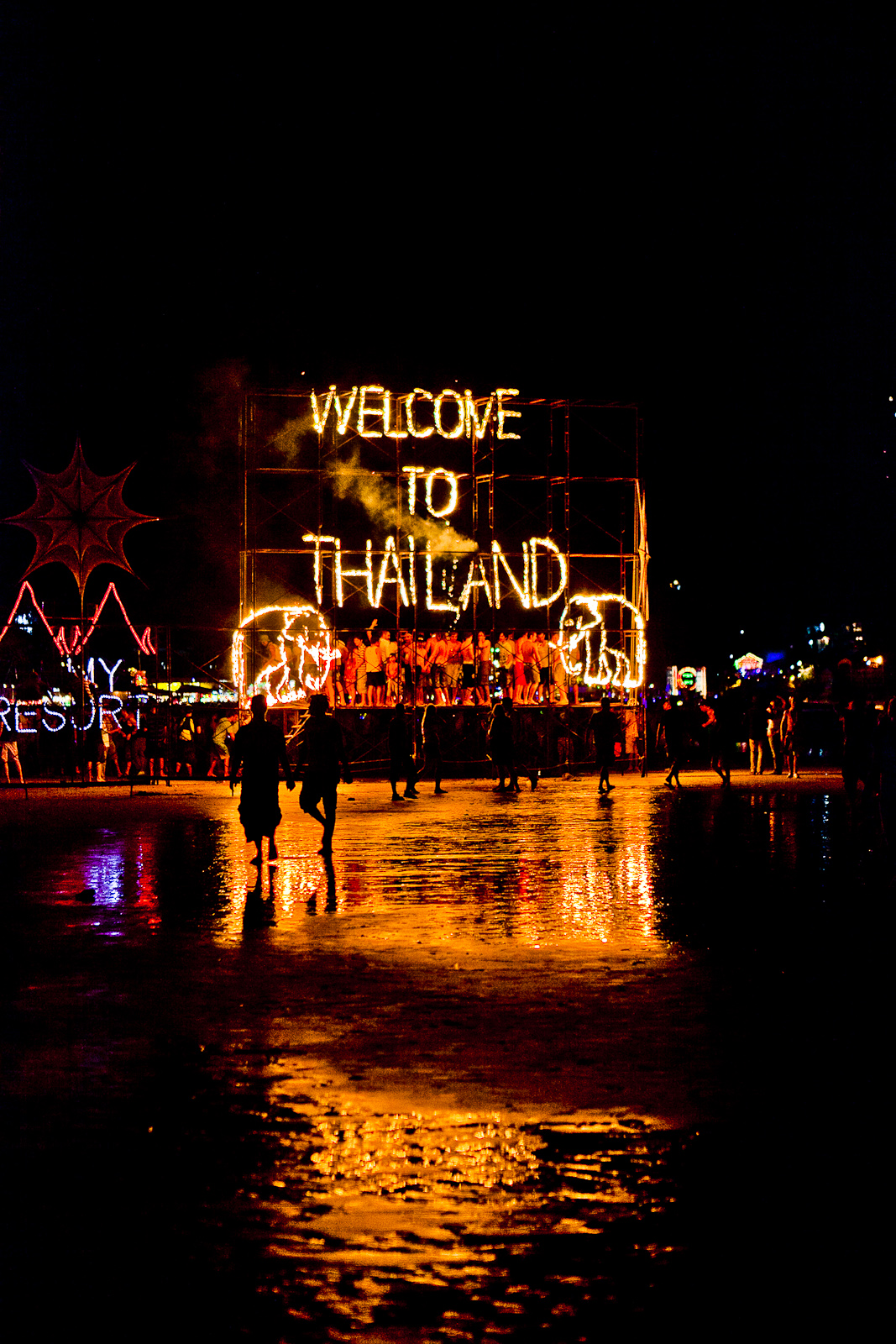
- Front of Tommy Resort, Hat Rin
- Genre: Electronic music, etc.
- Dates: 1980s–present
- Locations: Haad Rin, Ko Pha-ngan, Thailand

The Full Moon Party (Thai: ฟูลมูนปาร์ตี้) is an all-night beach party that originated in Haad Rin on the island of Ko Pha-ngan, Thailand in 1985. The party takes place on the night of, before, or after every full moon. In 2010, The Guardian described it as "the largest beach rave in the world".

== History ==
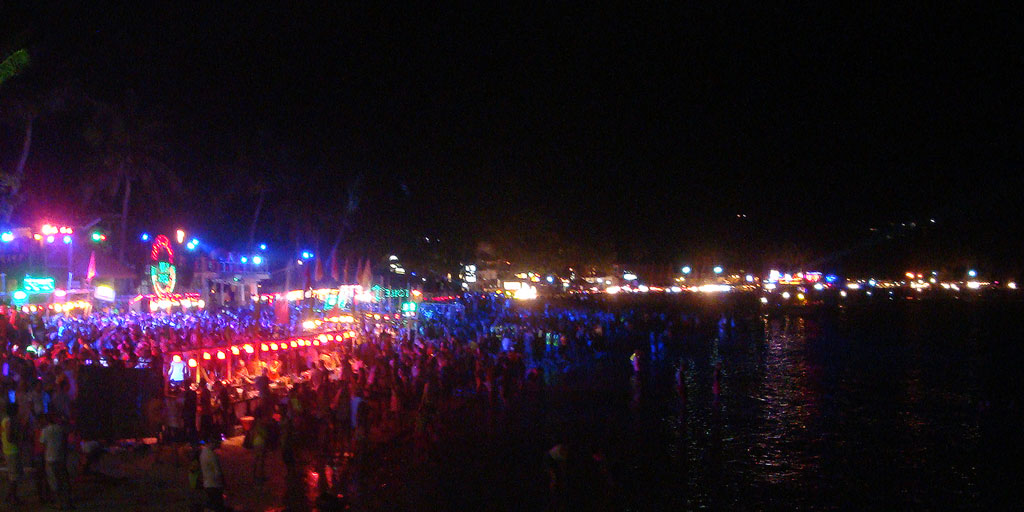
Full Moon Party, March 2015, view over Hat Rin Sunrise Beach

The first Full Moon Party is said to have been improvised at a Paradise Bungalows on the beach in 1983 as a token of thanks to about 20–30 travelers, though the accuracy of this is disputed, as is the date of the original event. The parties gained fame through word of mouth, and the event now draws a crowd of about 5,000–30,000 every full moon. The party finishes at sunrise the next day. The bars on Sunrise Beach of Haad Rin play music such as psychedelic trance, R&B, drum and bass, house, dance, and reggae. The event has become a part of the itinerary of many travelers to Southeast Asia.

The ruling military government in late 2014 banned all but the Full Moon Party. A police colonel summed up the attitude of the government when he said, "The sort of tourist that comes here to drink too much and take drugs are not the type that Thailand wants." The ban may not have been observed by local authorities, as on 5 April 2015, all parties except the Full Moon Party were again banned on Ko Pha-ngan. This was ordered by the district chief officer, Krirkkrai Songthani, after a meeting with local leaders on 3 April to discuss complaints from residents about noise pollution from the various large parties taking place up to 25 times each month. However, these bans are short-lived and lapse once they have served their purpose.

With the stated political goal of attracting higher-class tourists, it is unclear how much longer the Full Moon Party will be permitted to continue. Already, the Tourist Authority of Thailand (TAT) webpage for Ko Pha-ngan makes minimal mention of the Full Moon Party.

In 2020, the event was cancelled due to the COVID-19 pandemic. Parties resumed on 16 April 2022 with the easing of restrictions by the government.

== Frequency ==
The monthly Full Moon Party takes place on the night of the full moon, or one night earlier or later, if there is a significant religious holiday on the night of the full moon. It involves a wide spectrum of music, ranging from trance, to drum and bass, to reggae, with events taking place in various clubs along Hat Rin beach.

The October 2017 event and all other parties and music activities on Ko Pha-ngan was canceled out of respect for the cremation ceremony of the late king Bhumibol Adulyadej.

== Safety issues ==
Although drugs are consumed by many partygoers, drug laws are strict and police enforcement is stepped up during the parties. There are undercover police on patrol and even the drug dealers themselves may report drug users to police. In recent years, there has been a number of assaults and robberies at the party and in bars in the surrounding area, leading the British government to officially warn tourists to exercise caution at Full Moon Parties. Break-ins at hotel bungalows while partygoers are away from their rooms sometimes occur as well.

== In popular culture ==
The Full Moon Party has been featured in films such as The Beach, Last Stop for Paul, and the Thai film Hormones. It was also featured in the first episode of the Comedy Central TV show Gerhard Reinke's Wanderlust. In 2011, the island's parties featured on Tourism and the Truth: Stacey Dooley Investigates, a documentary investigating the negative impacts of tourism on local people and the economy. It was featured in episode 4 of E4's comedy-drama series Gap Year.

== Gallery ==
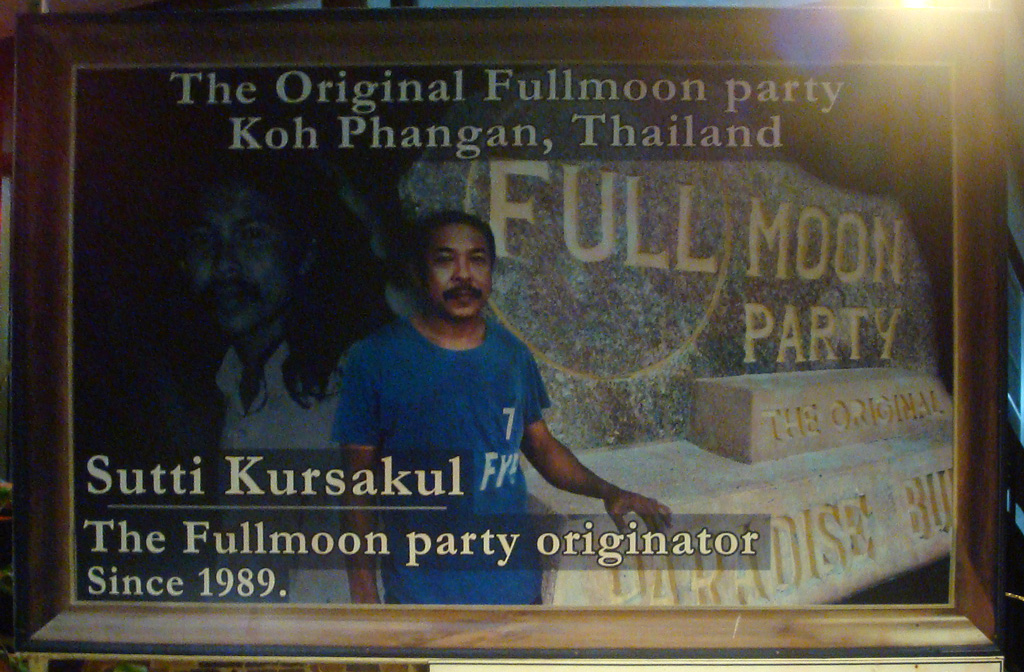
Full Moon Party creator Sutti Kursakul. Poster at Paradise Bungalows, Haad Rin, Ko Pha-ngan, 2016.

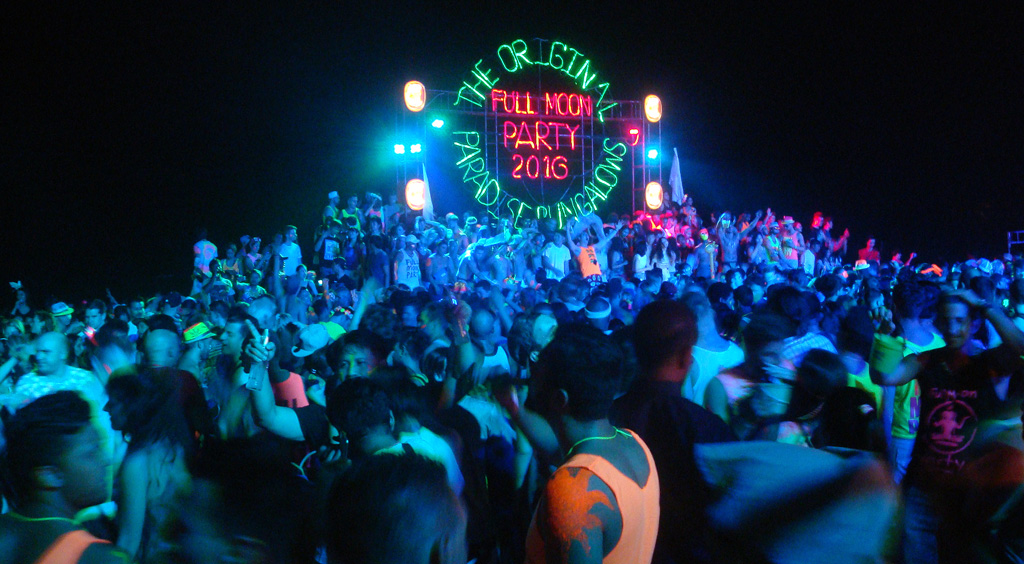
Full Moon Party, 23 February 2016, front of Paradise Bungalows at Haad Rin Sunrise Beach, Ko Pha-ngan

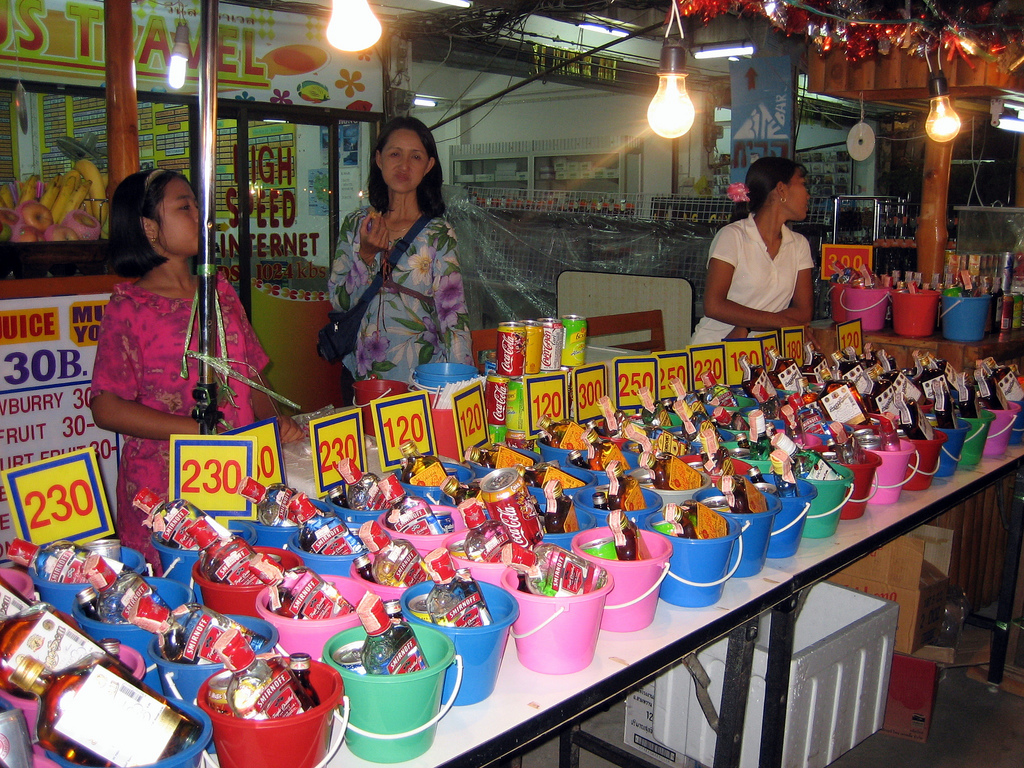
Buckets of alcoholic beverages for sale at the Full Moon Party

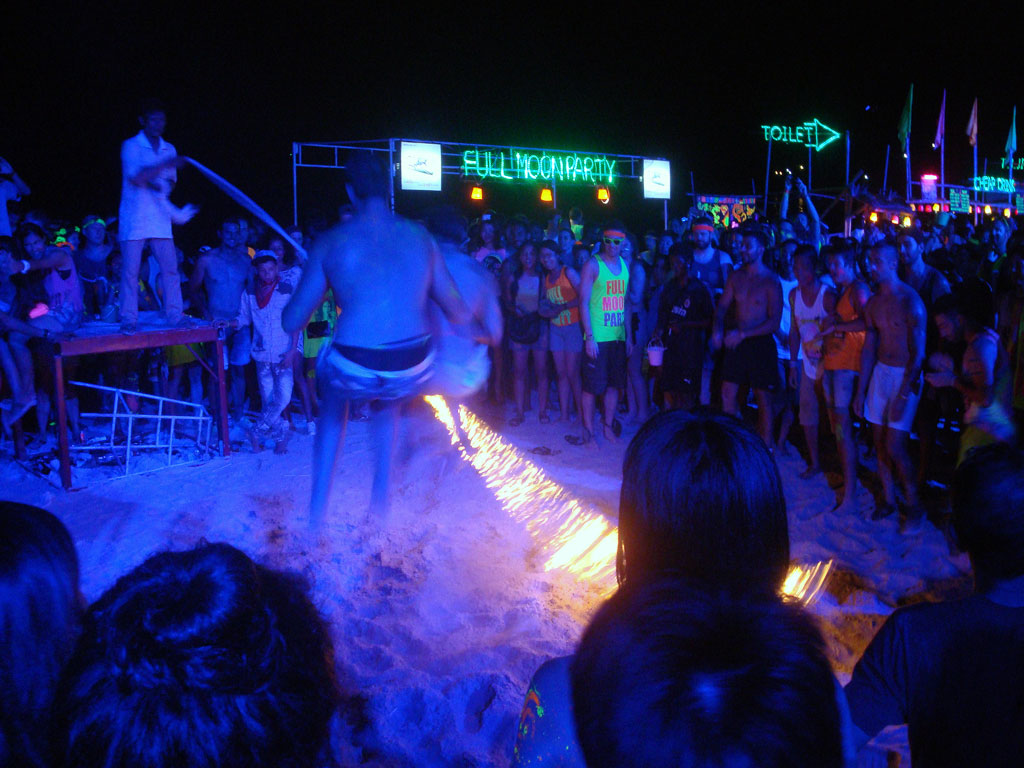
Playing fire skipping rope at Full Moon Party

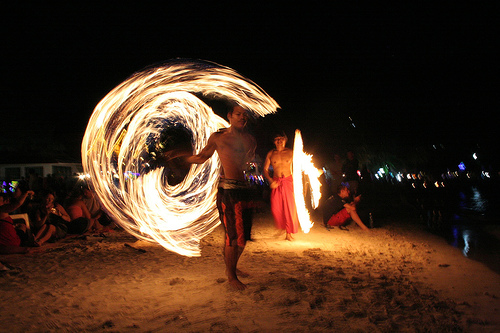
Fire dancers at Full Moon Party

== See also ==
- List of electronic music festivals
