= Soap Opera Digest Award for Outstanding Villainess in a Drama Series – Daytime =

Television award category

Soap Opera Digest Award Outstanding Villainess in a Drama Series – Daytime
- Awarded for: Outstanding Villainess in a Drama Series – Daytime
- Country: United States

The Soap Opera Digest Award for Outstanding Villainess in a Drama Series – Daytime has been given every year since the first Soap Opera Digest Award in 1984 until the award's end in 2005. There were no awards presented in 1987, 2002 or 2004. The category was split up into Soap Opera Digest Award for Outstanding Villain/Villainess in a Drama Series – Daytime only in 1993, 1994, and 2000.

In the lists below, the winner of the award for each year is shown first, followed by the other nominees. In 1984 and 1985, the nominees aren't listed only the winners.

== Winners ==
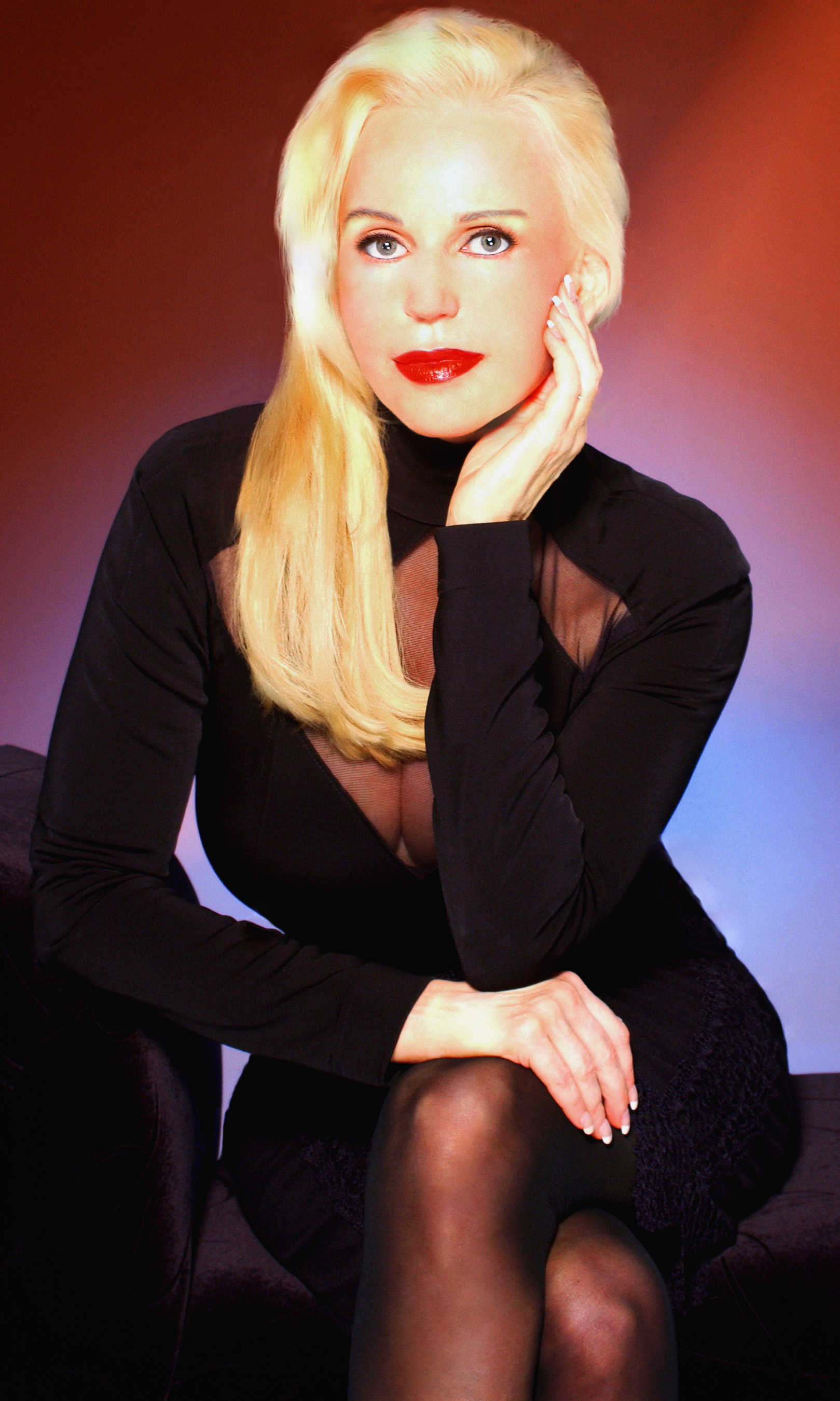
Brenda Dickson won in 1988 for her portrayal of Jill Foster Abbott on The Young and the Restless.

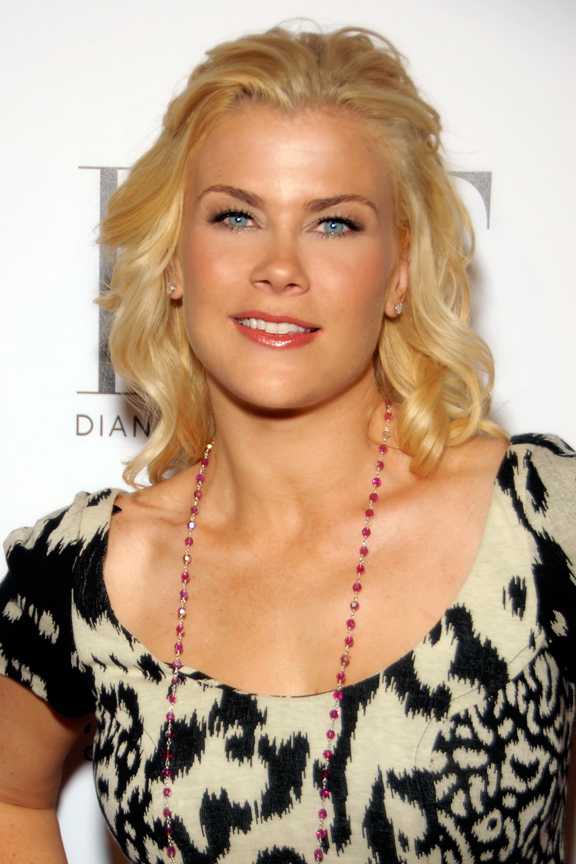
Alison Sweeney won in 1996, 1998, and 1999 or her portrayal of Sami Brady on Days of Our Lives.

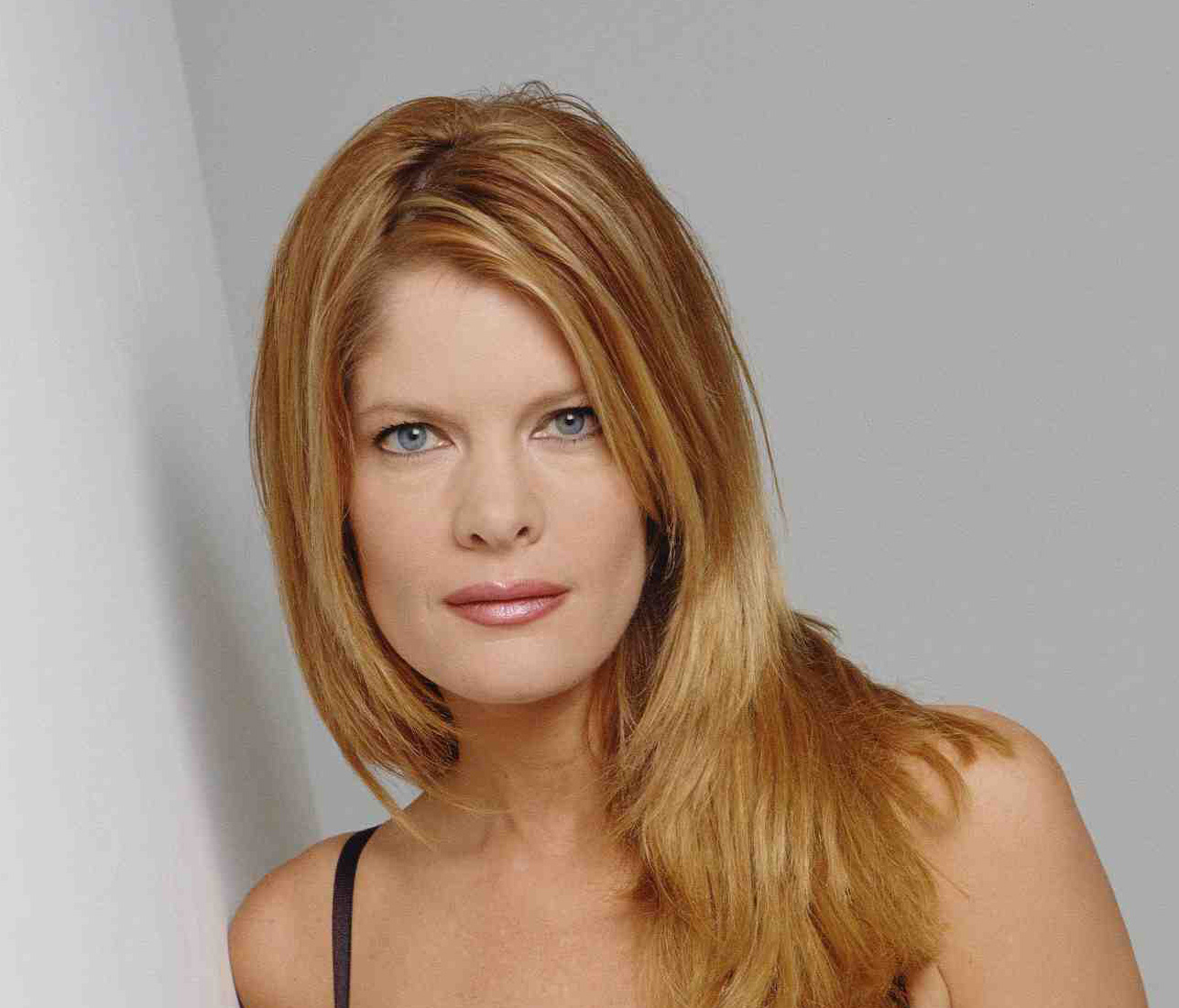
Michelle Stafford won in 1997 for her role as Phyllis Summers on The Young and the Restless.

Year	Actress	Program	Role	Network	Ref
1984 (1st)
1984 (1st)	Nancy Frangione‡	Another World	Cecile DePoulignac	NBC	
1985 (2nd)
1985 (2nd)	Cheryl-Ann Wilson‡	Days of Our Lives	Megan Hathaway	NBC	
1986 (2nd)
1986 (2nd)	Linda Gibboney ‡	Santa Barbara	Gina Blake Lockridge	NBC	
1988 (3rd)
1988 (3rd)	Brenda Dickson‡	The Young and the Restless	Jill Foster Abbott	CBS	
1989 (4th)
1989 (4th)	Lynn Herring ‡	General Hospital	Lucy Coe	ABC	
1990 (5th)
1990 (5th)	Jane Elliot ‡	General Hospital	Tracy Quartermaine	ABC	
1991 (6th)
1991 (6th)	Lynn Herring ‡	General Hospital	Lucy Coe	ABC	
1992 (7th)
1992 (7th)	Lynn Herring ‡	General Hospital	Lucy Coe	ABC	
1993 (8th)
1993 (8th)	Kimberlin Brown ‡	The Bold and the Beautiful; The Young and the Restless	Sheila Carter	CBS	
1995 (10th)
1995 (10th)	Kimberlin Brown ‡	The Bold and the Beautiful	Sheila Carter	CBS	
1996 (11th)
1996 (11th)	Alison Sweeney ‡	Days of Our Lives	Sami Brady	NBC	
1997 (12th)
1997 (12th)	Michelle Stafford ‡	The Young and the Restless	Phyllis Summers	CBS	
1998 (13th)
1998 (13th)	Alison Sweeney ‡	Days of Our Lives	Sami Brady	NBC	
1999 (14th)
1999 (14th)	Alison Sweeney ‡	Days of Our Lives	Sami Brady	NBC	
2001 (16th)
2001 (16th)	Arianne Zucker ‡	Days of Our Lives	Nicole Walker	NBC	
2005 (17th)
2005 (17th)	Jane Elliot ‡	General Hospital	Tracy Quartermaine	ABC	

Outstanding Villain/Villainess

Year	Actress	Program	Role	Network	Ref
1994 (9th)
1994 (9th)	Louise Sorel ‡	Days of Our Lives	Vivian Alamain	NBC	
2000 (15th)
2000 (15th)	Timothy D. Stickney ‡	One Life to Live	RJ Gannon	ABC	

== Multiple wins ==
Wins	Actress
3	Lynn Herring
3	Alison Sweeney
2	Kimberlin Brown
2	Jane Elliot

== Total awards won ==
Number	Program
6	Days of our Lives
5	General Hospital
3	The Young and the Restless
2	The Bold and the Beautiful
1	Another World
1	Santa Barbara
1	One Life to Live
