= Beg, Borrow & Deal =

- Starring: Rich Eisen (season 1), Summer Sanders (season 2)
- Country of origin: United States
- No. of seasons: 2
- No. of episodes: 14

Production
- Executive producers: Michael Mandt; Neil Mandt
- Running time: 60 minutes

Original release
- Network: ESPN
- Release: September 17, 2002 – August 20, 2003

Beg, Borrow & Deal is a reality television show that aired on ESPN with a first season hosted by Rich Eisen in 2002 and a second season hosted by Summer Sanders in 2003.

== Premise ==
The show, which was originally called "Beg, Borrow and B.S.", featured two teams of four pitted against each other. The object of the game was to get from one point in the United States to another, while completing sports-related tasks from a list given to them at the start of the game. However, the contestants were only allowed the clothes on their backs and their drivers' licenses; they could never handle any form of money. This forced the players to "beg, borrow, and deal" for meals, transportation, and nightly lodging. Further restrictions included:

- Contestants could only use someone's help for 12 hours (such as transportation or housing aid)
- Anything provided to the contestants had to be used or disposed of in 12 hours (such as food)
- Contestants had to rest for at least six hours per 24 hours
- Only one sports task could be completed per state
- Only five tasks could be completed per time zone

The sports-related tasks were scored from 1 to 3 points, with 10 points needed to complete the game. The first team to reach the designated finish line having completed 10 points' worth of tasks won the game and tickets to four major championship events of the following year.

== Airing ==
The network aired two seasons of seven episodes each. One aired in late 2002, and the second aired in mid-2003. In the UK the show was aired on ABC1. In the rest of Europe, episodes were broadcast on the North American Sports Network in 2005 and in Canada on GameTV beginning in 2007.

In 2002, ESPN reran the first season in a marathon the day after Thanksgiving.

The second season suffered from poor ratings, and was pulled from its original prime time slot. Remaining episodes were exhausted in a midnight time slot, and the show was cancelled soon after.

The Mandt Brothers were also executive producers of Former ESPN show Jim Rome Is Burning.
