= Michael Mandt =

American television producer (born 1971)

- Born: October 25, 1971 (age 54); Columbus, Ohio, U.S.
- Occupation: Producer
- Known for: Jim Rome Is Burning; Destination Truth; Last Stop for Paul; FantasySportsGirl.com
- Website: MandtBros.com

Michael Mandt (born October 25, 1971) is an American television producer.

== Early life ==
Born in Ohio, Mandt graduated from Fordham University in the Bronx, New York, and moved north to Bristol, Connecticut where he began his television career as a Production Assistant at ESPN working on SportsCenter and other studio shows.

== Television and film ==
In 2001, Michael and his brother Neil Mandt started Mandt Bros. Productions. That same year, they produced Reel Classics Uncut for ESPN. The following year, they produced ESPN's first reality show: Beg, Borrow & Deal. In 2003, the brothers created the show Jim Rome is Burning starring popular sports radio host Jim Rome. In 2004, they created the series My Crazy Life for E! Entertainment Television and in 2007 they created Destination Truth for the Sci Fi Channel. Michael has also produced and or directed segments of the ESPY awards since 2005.

Michael Mandt appeared in the film Hijacking Hollywood. More recently, he produced the indie film Last Stop for Paul in 2006.

In January 2012, Neil and his brother entered into a partnership agreement with RUFF China, the organization in who holds a permit to put on MMA events as a legal sport in the country of China. Together with his brother, Neil is working with RUFF to establish the world's biggest MMA league in the world, based in China.

== Internet ==
In 2007, Neil and Michael launched FantasySportsGirl.com, a site which provides daily video content for fantasy sports fans. The duo were also nominated for a Webby Award for their work on Last Stop for Paul.
