= Martin Wilhelm von Mandt =

German physician and professor

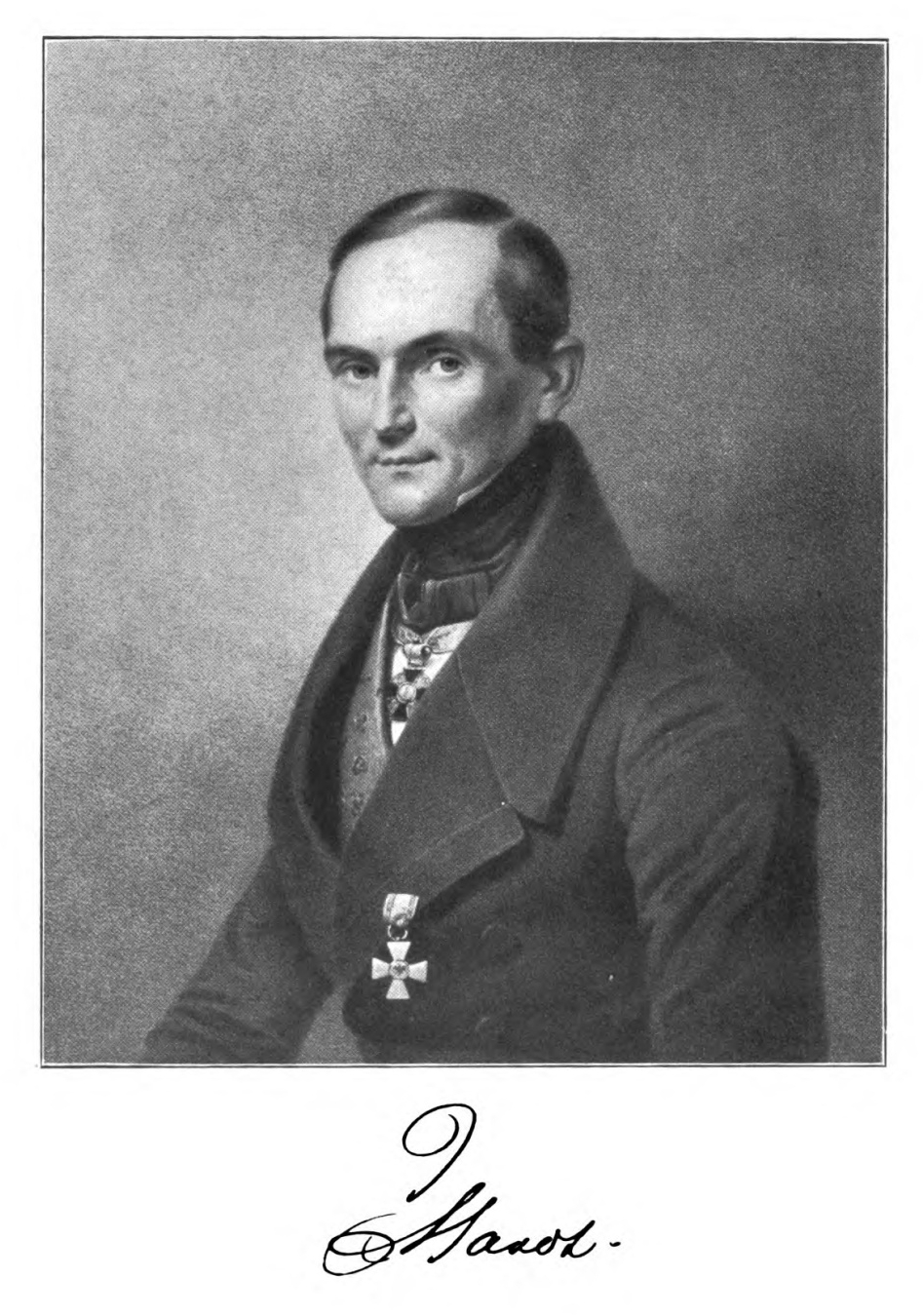

Martin Wilhelm von Mandt (6 August 1799 – 20 November 1858) was a German medical doctor and professor in Saint Petersburg in Imperial Russia. He was also a naturalist and collector of specimens. The species Uria mandtii (now a subspecies of the black guillemot), Lopholitodes mandtii and Dermaturus mandtii are named after him.

== Life and work ==
Mandt was born in Beyenburg, Wuppertal, to surgeon Martin and Franziska née Conet. The family later moved to Remscheid. He studied at home before going to grammar school in Düren (1813–1816). He studied medicine from his father and served as a military doctor in Aachen between 1816 and 1817. He then went to Berlin where he studied under Karl Asmund Rudolphi (1771-1832), Martin Hinrich Carl Lichtenstein (1780-1857) and Johann Nepomuk Rust (1775-1840). He worked in Prussian military hospitals at various times and in 1820 he transferred to the Gardeartilleriebrigade in Berlin. He became a ship doctor aboard the whaler Blücher to Greenland and Spitzbergen under the English captain John Rose the next year. He became interested in Arctic mammals and wrote a dissertation in 1822 titled Observationes in historiam naturalem et anatomiam comparatam in itinere Groenlandico factae and passed the state examination in 1824. From 1825 he worked in Küstrin as a district physician. He also became a member of the local Freemasonry. In 1830 he became a teacher of medicine at Greifswald in a clinic of his own. In 1832 he made a six-month journey through Germany, Italy, France and England during which time he examined the state of asylums and the treatment of insanity. He published several notes on the treatment of diseases and on new surgical methods. He accompanied the Grand Duchess of Russia (Helena Pavlovna) who had been advised to visit German baths by Rust. In 1836 he moved to Saint Petersburg. From 1840 he became personal physician to Tsar Nicholas I (1796-1855) and the Tsarina Alexandra Fedorovna. He treated the dying Tsar who suffered from a terminal lung infection, staying by his bed right until the time of his death. He later worked as a lecturer and in 1841 became a professor of therapy at the Imperial Medico-Surgical Academy in 1845 at Saint Petersburg. During the cholera epidemic of 1848-49 he used a controversial method of treatment called the "atomistic system", related to homeopathy. In 1855 he was elected to the Leopoldina Academy. He returned to Frankfurt on the Oder in 1856 and died there in 1858.

The black guillemot was described based on three specimen he collected in Spitzbergen. The name and the description was made by Lichtenstein, first published in Mandt's book in 1822 and then republished by Lichtenstein in 1823.

Mandt received the honorary title of Imperial Russian Secret Councillor, Russian Privy Councillor and in 1840 he was given the title of nobility and the Order of Saint Anna 1st Class. In 1883 a Mandt-Ackermann scholarship was established by the universities of Berlin and Bonn.
