= Last Stop for Paul =

- Directed by: Neil Mandt
- Written by: Neil Mandt
- Produced by: Neil Mandt; Michael Mandt; Maura Mandt; Marc Carter
- Starring: Neil Mandt; Marc Carter; Gregory Poppen; Eric Wing; Heather Petrone
- Cinematography: Marc Carter
- Release dates: April 1, 2006 (Sonoma Film Festival); March 7, 2008 (United States)
- Country: United States
- Language: English

Last Stop for Paul is a 2006 independent film by Neil Mandt. It chronicles the journey of two men to the Full Moon Party in Thailand. The film is notable in that there was no crew and no casting.

== Plot ==
Two buddies set out on a low-budget road trip that will take them around the world in this independent comedy-drama. Charlie and Cliff are two close friends who work together selling bathroom supplies. Charlie loves to travel and spends as much time as he can seeing the world on the cheap; Cliff, however, gets nervous about the prospect of going far away from home, and while he often promises to tag along with Charlie, he never does it. However, when Charlie proposes that they go to Thailand for the monthly Full Moon Party, the request coincides with the passing of Cliff's old buddy Paul. Paul had been planning a global journey at the time of his death, and Cliff decides to honor his friend's wishes by scattering Paul's ashes in the four corners of the earth. With two weeks available, Charlie and Cliff set out to visit as many nations as humanly possible, scamming room and board whenever they can, and releasing a bit of Paul's remains at every stop.

== Cast ==
- Neil Mandt – Charlie
- Marc Carter – Cliff
- Gregory Poppen – Will
- Eric Wing – Craig
- Heather Petrone – Amy
- Gavin Cooney – Frank
- Daithí Ó Caoimh – DOC

== Style ==
Despite being a narrative comedy, most of the dialogue was ad-lib. Additionally, almost all of the actors are regular people with no acting experience. The movie was shot completely on the fly, nothing was set up in advance.

== Critical reception ==
"... simply an ingenious way of constructing a good film out of virtually nothing."

— John Anderson, Variety

The film has won awards at over 45 film festivals.
