= Neil Mandt =

American television and film producer and director

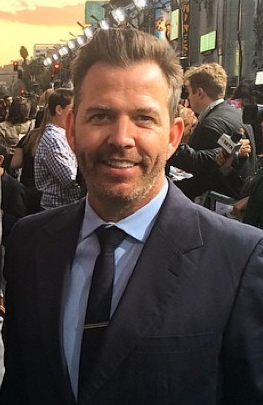
- Million Dollar Arm World Premiere at The El Capitain
- Occupations: Producer, Director, Tech Entrepreneur
- Known for: Jim Rome Is Burning; Destination Truth; Last Stop for Paul
- Website: NeilMandt.com

Neil Mandt is an American television and film producer, director, and technology entrepreneur. Based in Los Angeles, he has worked across broadcast television, feature films, and digital media since the 1990s. He is known for creating the ESPN series Jim Rome is Burning (2003) and Destination Truth (2007), co-producing the Disney film Million Dollar Arm (2014), and executive producing the 79th Golden Globe Awards (2018).

== Biography ==
Born in Czechoslovakia, Mandt moved to Los Angeles in the late 1980s and spent the 1990s directing three movies Hijacking Hollywood, The Million Dollar Kid and Arthur's Quest. He subsequently worked for NBC as a producer on its coverage of the 2000 Summer Olympics. In 2001, Mandt and his brother Michael Mandt founded Mandt Bros. Productions, which sold two series to ESPN: Reel Classics Uncut and Beg, Borrow & Deal.

In 2003, the Mandt Brothers created Jim Rome Is Burning for ESPN. In 2007 they created Destination Truth for the Sci Fi Channel, a series in which host Josh Gates investigated reports of mythical creatures and unexplained phenomena around the world. In 2006, Mandt wrote, directed, produced, and starred in the independent film, Last Stop for Paul. Last Stop For Paul was released theatrically in North America in March, 2008.

In 2010, Mandt wrote, directed, produced, and starred in the Showtime series Next Stop for Charlie, based on his feature film Last Stop for Paul.

In June 2011, Mandt and his brother partnered with Ranik Ultimate Fighting Federation (RUFF) China, a government-sanctioned MMA organization based in Shanghai, to oversee creative strategy and content production for live events and television series. In 2013, Mandt became engaged to marketing executive Lauren Dixon.

In late 2015, Mandt founded MANDT VR, a Los Angeles-based virtual reality and 360-degree video production company. In 2016, the company produced over 20 videos in 360-degree video format, creating content for PodcastOne and Oklahoma State University. In spring 2017, Mandt produced Dog Years, directed by Adam Rifkin and starring Burt Reynolds and Ariel Winter. The film premiered at the Tribeca Film Festival and was subsequently acquired by A24 and DirecTV for North American distribution.

In January 2017, MANDT VR partnered with Forbes and PodcastOne to release 30 virtual reality 360-degree videos, totaling more than an hour of content. That same month, MANDT VR formed a partnership with the Pittsburgh Steelers to produce immersive 360-degree virtual reality videos of game day experiences at Heinz Field. In April 2017, MANDT VR partnered with the College Football Playoff to produce content for the College Football Playoff National Championship.

In late 2017, IndyCar announced a partnership with MANDT VR to produce augmented reality and virtual reality content for the racing series. In spring 2018, Mandt received a Clio Award for the 360-degree video production The Road to the Super Bowl, featuring the Philadelphia Eagles. In 2020, Mandt and his wife Lauren Mandt released the CrimeDoor app on iOS and Android, an augmented reality platform focused on true crime content. The app allows users to access content related to real crime cases, and features AR reconstructions of crime scenes. In January 2022, Mandt and his brother Michael executive produced the 79th Golden Globe Awards.

In 2022, Mandt founded the Digital Rights Network, a platform for building owners and developers to register and manage digital rights to physical properties in relation to augmented reality.
