= Morbid: A True Crime Podcast =

American true crime podcast

- Language: English

Cast and voices
- Hosted by: Alaina Urquhart; Ash Kelley

Publication
- Original release: May 2018
- Provider: Morbid Network

Morbid: A True Crime Podcast is an American true crime anthology podcast hosted by author and former autopsy technician Alaina Urquhart and her niece Ash Kelley, a former hairdresser. Though Urquhart is Kelley's aunt, the two often refer to each other as "sisters". The podcast premiered on May 1, 2018. Morbid has been included on best-of lists by Erie Reader, Vogue, The Post, and Bleeding Cool.

In 2022 Urquhart and Kelley started a podcast network called "Morbid Network" under the umbrella of the Wondery podcast network. Five podcasts exist under the production of the Morbid Network: Cult Liter with Spencer Henry, That's Spooky, Seven Deadly Sinners, Scream!, and The Strange and Unusual Podcast.

Aside from Morbid, from November 2021 to June 2022, Urquhart and Kelly also hosted a podcast in partnership with Parcast called "Crime Countdown".

Urquhart published her first novel, The Butcher and the Wren, in September 2022 through independent publisher Zando. The book's sequel, The Butcher Game, was published in 2024, and a third title in the series, The Butcher Legacy, was published in 2026.

Morbid: A True Crime Podcast is currently ranked in the top 20 podcasts in the United States on Spotify and Apple Podcasts as of February 20, 2023.

In December 2024, Apple announced that Morbid was the 10th most popular podcast on their Apple Podcasts platform in the United States, in 2024.

== List of episodes and topics ==
=== 2018 ===
	Episode Title	Air Date
1	Golden State Killer	1 May 2018
2	Edmund Kemper "The Coed Killer" & Chatty Cathy	9 May 2018
3	The Dyatlov Pass Incident	15 May 2018
4	Joel Rifkin	22 May 2018
5	Ted Bundy Part 1	29 May 2018
6	Ted Bundy Part 2	15 June 2018
7	Charles Manson Part 1 Ya dig?	26 Jun 2018
8	Charles Manson "The Love Bug Sent From Up Above" Part 2	4 July 2018
9	The Axeman of New Orleans AKA A Real Crumb	11 July 2018
10	The Sodder Children .... where the hell are they?	25 July 2018
11	Don't Go in the Woods, Man	1 August 2018
12	Australian Madness Volume 1	9 August 2018
13	Torture	16 August 2018
14	Richard "Stanky Chops" Ramirez, AKA "The Nightstalker" Part 1	21 August 2018
15	Richard "Stanky Chops" Ramirez, AKA "The Nightstalker" Part 2	24 August 2018
16	The Lake Bodom Murders	28 August 2018
17	Rod Ferrell "The Vampire Cult Killer" AKA Turbo Douche	4 September 2018
18	Katherine Knight is the Worst Nana	11 September 2018
19	Hinterkaifek	18 September 2018
20	David Parker Ray AKA "The Toy Box Killer" Part 1	26 September 2018
21	David Parker Ray AKA "The Toy Box Killer" Part 2	1 October 2018
22	Joshua Ward House/Giles Corey (Special guests The Right Wrong Turn Podcast)	10 October 2018
23	The Salem Witch Trials	16 October 2018
24	The Gainesville Ripper Has Spooky Droopy Eyes	23 October 2018
25	Urban Legends	2 November 2018
*26	The Starved Rock Murders	8 November 2018
27	The Survival Story of Mary Vincent, Patron Saint of Badassery	19 November 2018
28	The Brutal Murder of Adrianne Reynolds	28 November 2018
29	The Lawson Family Murders	4 December 2018
30	Santa's Dark Helpers	7 December 2018
*31	The Los Feliz Murder House	12 December 2018
32	Faeries Are Dark Part 1	14 December 2018
*33	Jon Benet Ramsey Part 1	21 December 2018
*34	Jon Benet Ramsey Part 2	31 December 2018

=== 2019 ===
	Episode Title	Air Date
35	Faeries Are Dark Part 2	2 January 2019
*36	Tyler Hadley	8 January 2019
*37	The Watcher House	15 January 2019
*38	The Black Dahlia Part 1	22 January 2019
*39	Who Put Bella in the Witch Elm?	24 January 2019
40	The Senseless Murder of Sara Porter	26 January 2019
*41	The Black Dahlia Part 1: Theories and Suspects	29 January 2019
42	The Paisley Witch Trials	1 February 2019
43	Robert Hansen Part 1	6 February 2019
44	The Seattle Excedrin Poisonings	8 February 2019
45	Robert Hansen Part 2	13 February 2019
46	The Paris Morgue Mini Morbid	13 February 2019
47	Betty Broderick Minisode	20 February 2019
*48	The Murder of Skylar Neese	27 February 2019
49	Public Executions and the Psychology of Watching Pain Mini Morbid	1 March 2019
50	Margaret Allen	7 March 2019
51	Countess Elizabeth Bathory	13 March 2019
52	The Missing Panama Tourists	16 March 2019
53	Part 1 Karla Homolka & Paul Bernado "The Ken and Barbie Killers"	21 March 2019
54	Crystal Mangum	23 March 2019
55	Karla Homolka & Paul Bernardo Part 2	28 March 2019
56	The Horrific Murder of Jason Sweeney Mini Morbid	1 April 2019
57	The Body Farm Solo Mini Morbid	5 April 2019
58	Kurt Cobain Part 1	11 April 2019
59	Christina Paolilla & Chris Snyder	15 April 2019
60	Kurt Cobain Part 2	17 April 2019
61	The Halloween Party Murder of Chelsea Bruck Not-So-Mini Morbid	24 April 2019
62	Israel Keyes Part 1	26 April 2019
63	Israel Keyes Part 2	6 May 2019
64	Daniel LaPlante Mini Morbid	7 May 2019
65	Extremely Wicked, Shockingly Evil and Vile Review	11 May 2019
66	Jasmine Richardson & Jeremy Steinke Part 1	17 May 2019
67	Jasmine Richardson & Jeremy Steinke Part 2	18 May 2019
68	The Murder of Angela Samota	23 May 2019
69	The Bloody Benders	30 May 2019
70	The Survival Tale of Jennifer Morey Mini Morbid	1 June 2019
71	The Mysterious Death of Phoebe Handsjuk Part 1	4 June 2019
72	Jesse "Madison" Holton Mini Morbid	8 June 2019
73	The Mysterious Death of Phoebe Handsjuk Part 2	14 June 2019
74	The Bridgewater Triangle Part 1	18 June 2019
75	The Murders at Corpsewood Manor Mini Morbid	20 June 2019
76	The Bridgewater State Triangle Part 2/ The Murder of Mary Lou Arruda/The Cult Murders of Freetown State Forest	25 June 2019
77	Diane Downs Mini Morbid	1 July 2019
78	The Boston Strangler Part 1	6 July 2019
79	The Boston Strangler(s) Part 2	8 July 2019
80	The Murder of Maddie Clifton "Mini" Morbid	13 July 2019
81	The Boston Strangler(s) Part 3	17 July 2019
82	The Tragic Case of Susan Powell Mini Morbid	22 July 2019
83	The Strange Case of Hallie Illingworth	29 July 2019
84	The Unbelievable Survival Tale of Susan Walters Mini Morbid	2 August 2019
85	Dennis Rader "BTK" Part 1 So Much and Not Enough	8 August 2019
86	The Senseless Murder of Seath Jackson Mini Morbid	9 August 2019
87	Dennis Rader "BTK" Part 2	17 August 2019
88	Dennis Rader "BTK" Part 3	23 August 2019
89	The Princes in the Tower Mini Morbid	24 August 2019
	Listener Tales Episode 1	29 August 2019
90	Brenda Ann Spencer Mini Morbid	2 September 2019
	Listener Tales Episode 2	14 September 2019
91	The Science of Fear Solo Morbid	21 September 2019
92	The Mysterious Death of Jessica Renee Johnson Mini Morbid	27 September 2019
93	The LuLuLemon Murder Part 1	29 September 2019
94	The LuLuLemon Murder Part 2	1 October 2019
95	The Senseless Murder of Rebecca Schaeffer Mini Morbid	6 October 2019
	Listener Tales Episode 3	10 October 2019
96	Lizzie Borden Part 1	20 October 2019
97	Lizzie Borden Part 2	25 October 2019
98	The Tragic Unsolved Murder of Lindsay Buziak Mini Morbid	27 October 2019
	Listener Tales Episode 4	2 November 2019
99	The Schoolbus Kidnapping of 1976	3 November 2019
*100	Jeffrey Dahmer Part 1	10 November 2019
101	Rodney Reed Mini Morbid	10 November 2019
*102	Jeffrey Dahmer Part 2	13 November 2019
103	Erika and Benjamin Sifrit, Natural Born Assholes Mini Morbid	17 November 2019
*104	Jeffrey Dahmer Part 3	23 November 2019
	Listener Tales 5	24 November 2019
	Listener Tales 6	29 November 2019
	Live Show 11/19 Providence, RI	1 December 2019
105	June and Jennifer Gibbons - The Silent Twins	8 December 2019
106	The Mysterious Murder of Jessica Chambers	8 December 2019
	Spooky American Roads Volume 1	14 December 2019
	Listener Tales 7	15 December 2019
107	The Covina Christmas Eve Massacre	21 December 2019
108	Christmas Murders Mini Morbid	22 December 2019
	Spooky American Roads Volume 2	27 December 2019
109	The Mysterious Disappearance of Bryce Laspisa	29 December 2019

=== 2020 ===
	Episode Title	Air Date
110	What Happened to Alissa Turney?	5 January 2020
	Morbid Soup Dissects Jennifer's Body	6 January 2020
	Listener Tales 8	11 January 2020
111	Robert Ben Rhoades, AKA The Truck Stop Killer	12 January 2020
112	The Abduction and Murder of Polly Klaas	19 January 2020
113	The Keddie Cabin Murders Mini Morbid	19 January 2020
	Special Mini Morbid: A Chat With Jessica Clifton	25 January 2020
114	The Amazing Survival Tale of Michelle Knight, Amanda Berry and Gina DeJesus Part 1	26 January 2020
115	David Berkowitz "Son of Sam" Live at the Gramercy Theater in NYC	1 February 2020
	Listener Tales 9	2 February 2020
116	The Amazing Survival Tale of Michelle Knight, Amanda Berry and Gina DeJesus Part 2	14 February 2020
117	Flinders Highway AKA the Highway of Death Aussie Madness	16 February 2020
118	Sleep Paralysis	16 February 2020
119	Dorian Corey: The Mummy in the Drag Queen's Closet	22 February 2020
120	The Tragic Murder of Paige Doherty	23 February 2020
121	The Murder of Sarah Stern Mini Morbid	23 February 2020
122	The West Memphis Three Part 1	1 March 2020
	Listener Tales 10	1 March 2020
123	West Memphis 3 Part 2	7 March 2020
124	The Blackburn Cult Mini Morbid	8 March 2020
	Spooky Roads Volume 3	14 March 2020
125	The West Memphis Three part 3	15 March 2020
126	The West Memphis Three Part 4	22 March 2020
	Listener Tales 11	22 March 2020
127	Spirit & Demon Games that Will Ruin Your Actual Life	28 March 2020
128	The Abduction of Jayme Closs Mini Morbid	29 March 2020
129	Kelly Ann Bates	4 April 2020
130	The History of the Ouija Mini Morbid	5 April 2020
	Listener Tales 12	11 April 2020
131	Where is Don Lewis? Does Carole Baskin Know? Mini Morbid (Not Really)	12 April 2020
132	The Mysterious Murder of Karina Holmer	15 April 2020
	BONUS EPISODE: Discussing "The Invisible Man" With Johnny and Tyler from That's Spooky	23 April 2020
*133	Karina Holmer Part 2	16 April 2020
134	John Wayne Gacy Part 1	26 April 2020
135	Ezra McCandless AKA Monica Mini Morbid	26 April 2020
136	The 2011 Oslo Bombing and Utoya Island Massacre "Mini" Morbid	2 May 2020
137	John Wayne Gacy Part 2: The Murders	3 May 2020
138	The Haunting Of The Palmer House Hotel, The Victor Hotel & The Spaghetti Factory	10 May 2020
139	John Wayne Gacy Part 3	11 May 2020
140	Liquid Matthew, Maria Del Carmen and Dorothy Jane Scott With Special Guest Christine Schiefer!	16 May 2020
141	The Tragic Death of Kendrick Johnson	17 May 2020
	Listener Tales 13	22 May 2020
142	Maria Elena Milagro De Hoyos, The Unwilling Corpse Bride With Special Guest Rachel O'Brien	24 May 2020
143	Lori Vallow Part 1	30 May 2020
144	Zach Bowen and the Murder of Addie Hall Mega Mini Morbid	1 June 2020
145	Lori Vallow Part 2	6 June 2020
146	Mary King's Close/Nor Loch	7 June 2020
147	The Mysterious and Tragic Death of Kenneka Jenkins	13 June 2020
148	Lori Vallow Update Mini Episode	14 June 2020
	Listener Tales 14	14 June 2020
149	The Tragic Murder of Matthew Shepard Part 1	19 June 2020
150	The Tragic Murder of Matthew Shepard Part 2	21 June 2020
151	The Mysterious Death of Tamla Horsford	27 June 2020
152	The Life and Mysterious Death of Marsha P. Johnson	28 June 2020
153	The Hex House Murder	4 July 2020
	Listener Tales 15	5 July 2020
154	The Galveston 11 Part 1	10 July 2020
155	The Galveston 11 Part 2	12 July 2020
156	The Irish Vanishing Triangle Part 1	15 July 2020
157	The Senseless Murder of Vanessa Guillen	18 July 2020
158	The Irish Vanishing Triangle Part 2	23 July 2020
159	Virtual Live Show! Texarkana Moonlight Murders & The New Orleans Trunk Murders	25 July 2020
	Listener Tales 16	29 July 2020
160	The Jenny Jones Secret Crush Murder Case	1 August 2020
161	The Scream Murder of Cassie Jo Stoddart	8 August 2020
162	The Gruesome Murder of Brenda Sue Schaefer Part 1	8 August 2020
163	The Gruesome Murder of Brenda Sue Schaefer Part 2	13 August 2020
164	The Twilight Murders	15 August 2020
165	The Gruesome Murder of Brenda Sue Schaefer Part 3	19 August 2020
166	Ian Brady & Myra Hindley AKA The Moors Murderers Part 1	23 August 2020
167	Ian Brady & Myra Hindley AKA The Moors Murderers Part 2	26 August 2020
168	Ian Brady & Myra Hindley AKA The Moors Murderers Part 3	29 August 2020
169	Ian Brady & Myra Hindley AKA The Moors Murderers Part 4	2 September 2020
	Listener Tales 17	5 September 2020
170	The Mysterious Death of Brittany Murphy	11 September 2020
171	Lake Shawnee Amusement Park	13 September 2020
	Listener Tales 18: The Loosey Goosey Edition	19 September 2020
172	The Papin Sisters	20 September 2020
173	The Twisted Deeds and Many Names of Peter Tobin	24 September 2020
174	Bible John	27 September 2020
175	The Brutal Murder of Elyse Pahler	2 October 2020
	Listener Tales 19	3 October 2020
176	The Origins of Halloween/Samhain Traditions	7 October 2020
177	The Haunting of the Borley Rectory	9 October 2020
178	The Chicago Ripper Crew	11 October 2020
179	The Whaley House	14 October 2020
180	The Bizarre Murder of Marlene Warren	18 October 2020
	Listener Tales: Jon Allen Edition	20 October 2020
181	Myrtles Plantation	22 October 2020
182	The Dybbuk Box	25 October 2020
*183	The Frankston Serial Killer	1 November 2020
	Listener Tales 20	1 November 2020
184	The Unbelievable Life & Crimes of Carl Panzram Part 1	5 November 2020
185	The Unbelievable Life & Crimes of Carl Panzram Part 2	8 November 2020
186	The Mysterious Unsolved Death of Elisa Lam	13 November 2020
187	The Farmville Murders	14 November 2020
188	Angela Diaz	18 November 2020
	Listener Tales 21	21 November 2020
189	The Murder of Sydney Loofe AKA The Tinder Murder	26 November 2020
190	Martha Haney	28 November 2020
191	The Horrific Murder of Dorothy Stratten	4 December 2020
192	The Tragic Murder of Sarah Ludemann	5 December 2020
193	The Horrific Kidnapping & Murder of Sarah Haley Foxwell	11 December 2020
	Listener Tales 22	12 December 2020
	"The Meaning Of Christmas" By Jon Allen Bonus Episode!!	16 December 2020
194	Tony Costa, The Cape Cod Vampire Part 1	18 December 2020
195	Tony Costa, The Cape Cod Vampire Part 2	20 December 2020
	Illinois Spooky Roads/Listener Tales MASHUP	27 December 2020
196	The Senseless Murder of Lauren Giddings	27 December 2020

=== 2021 ===
	Episode Title	Air Date
197	Oklahoma Girl Scout Murders Part 1	2 January 2021
198	The Oklahoma Girl Scout Murders Part 2	3 January 2021
199	Susan Wright	7 January 2021
200	The Weepy Voiced Killer	9 January 2021
201	Black Eyed Children with special guest Tyler Gaca AKA Ghosthoney	14 January 2021
	Listener Tales 23	17 January 2021
202	The Tragic Story of Cinnamon Brown	22 January 2021
203	The Mysterious Disappearance of Brittanee Drexel	23 January 2021
204	The Mysterious Disappearance of Brittanee Drexel Part 2	25 January 2021
*205	Richard Beasley "The Other Craigslist Killer"	29 January 2021
206	The Bennington Triangle	31 January 2021
207	The Tragic Death of Emilie Morris	5 February 2021
208	The Horrific Murder of Ashley Young	6 February 2021
209	The Slenderman Stabbing	11 February 2021
	Listener Tales 24	13 February 2021
210	Willie Pickton Part 1	20 February 2021
211	Willie "Piggy" Pickton Part 2	21 February 2021
212	Willie Pickton Part 3	25 February 2021
213	Colleen Stan AKA The Girl In The Box	27 February 2021
	Listener Tales 25	28 February 2021
214	The Tragic Case of Molly Bish	6 March 2021
215	The Torture and Murder of Shanda Sharer	7 March 2021
	A Morbid Hang with Rainn Wilson as Terry Carnation from Dark Air with Terry Carnation	11 March 2021
216	The Mysterious & Cursed Turnbull Canyon	13 March 2021
217	The Tragic Murder of Dominique Dunne	14 March 2021
218	Who Put Bella In The Wych Elm?	18 March 2021
219	The Bell Witch	20 March 2021
220	The Tragic Murder of Kenia Monge/ The Incredible Survival Tale of Lydia Tillman	28 March 2021
221	The Los Feliz Murder House	28 March 2021
	Listener Tales 26	2 April 2021
222	The Mysterious Murder of Julia Wallace Part 1	4 April 2021
223	The Mysterious Murder of Julia Wallace Part 2	8 April 2021
224	The Mysterious Murder of Julia Wallace Part 3	12 April 2021
225	The Abduction and Murder of Daniel Morcombe	17 April 2021
226	Tyler Hadley (Redo!)	18 April 2021
227	The Mysterious Death of Thelma Todd (With Special Guest Cameron Esposito!)	22 April 2021
228	Gary Michael Hilton AKA The National Parks Serial Killer	25 April 2021
	Listener Tales 27	1 May 2021
229	The Tragic Death of Natalie Wood	2 May 2021
230	Catherine & David Birnie Part 1	8 May 2021
231	Catherine & David Birnie Part 2	8 May 2021
232	Morbid Chats With Heather Bish	13 May 2021
	Listener Tales 28	15 May 2021
233	The Smiley Face Deaths/Murders Mystery	16 May 2021
234	The Smiley Face Deaths/Murder Mystery	22 May 2021
235	The Unbelievable Tale of Michael Malloy AKA Mike The Durable	23 May 2021
236	Lake Lanier	29 May 2021
237	The Curse of Manchac Swamp	30 May 2021
238	The Phillip Island Murder	2 June 2021
239	The Long Island Lolita Case with Special Guest Bailey Sarian	7 June 2021
240	The Lady of the Dunes	12 June 2021
	Listener Tales 29	14 June 2021
241	Stephen Griffiths AKA The Crossbow Cannibal	18 June 2021
242	John Edward Robinson	21 June 2021
243	John Edward Robinson Part 2	25 June 2021
244	John Edward Robinson Part 3	25 June 2021
	Bonus Exclusive: A Chat with George C. Romero	2 July 2021
245	The Mysterious Disappearance of Melanie Ethier	3 July 2021
	Listener Tales 30	4 July 2021
246	Darrell Keith Rich Part 1	10 July 2021
247	Darrell Keith Rich Part 2	10 July 2021
	Spooky Roads Volume 4 AUSTRALIA!	14 July 2021
248	Marion Stembridge	17 July 2021
249	The Horrific Murders of Austin Wenner & Jessica Lewis	25 July 2021
250	Bettie Page	26 July 2021
251	Tara Calico	29 July 2021
252	Charles Schmid "The Pied Piper of Tucson"	31 July 2021
	Listener Tales 31	3 August 2021
253	Buried Alive	7 August 2021
254	The Erdington Murders	10 August 2021
255	True Crime Songs with Ronnie & Ben from Watch What Crappens!	16 August 2021
256	The Hillside Stranglers Part 1	22 August 2021
257	The Tragic Story of Barbara Daly Baekeland	22 August 2021
258	The Hillside Stranglers Part 2	24 August 2021
259	The Hillside Stranglers Part 3	27 August 2021
260	The Eastern State Penitentiary	31 August 2021
	Listener Tales 32	4 September 2021
261	The Sunset Strip Killers Part 1	8 September 2021
262	The Sunset Strip Killers Part 2	12 September 2021
263	The Murder of Mackenzie Cowell	14 September 2021
264	The New England Vampire Panic	19 September 2021
265	Tragedy & True Crime at the Jean Harlow House	23 September 2021
266	The Unbelievable Survival Story of Holly K. Dunn	25 September 2021
267	The Unexplained Death of Ellen Rae Greenberg	28 September 2021
268	The Railroad Killer	3 October 2021
	Listener Tales *Patreon Edition*	5 October 2021
269	The Murder of Nancy Rentz	9 October 2021
	*BONUS* Listener Tales Patreon Edition: PART 2	11 October 2021
270	Jodi Arias	14 October 2021
271	The Villisca Axe Murders Part 1	17 October 2021
272	The Villisca Axe Murders Part 2	20 October 2021
273	The Winchester Mystery House (Separating Fact From Fiction)	25 October 2021
274	The Friday the 13th Murder	30 October 2021
275	Susan Monica	1 November 2021
	Listener Tales 33	3 November 2021
276	The Murder of Nona Dirksmeyer	9 November 2021
277	The Investor Murders: Alaska's Largest Mass Murder	12 November 2021
278	William Bonin "The Freeway Killer" Part 1	13 November 2021
279	William Bonin "The Freeway Killer" Part 2	17 November 2021
280	The "TallHotBlond" Murder	22 November 2021
281	The Dark Secrets Behind The Wizard of Oz	24 November 2021
282	Murder in the House of Gucci	28 November 2021
	Listener Tales 34	1 December 2021
283	Dorothea Puente Part 1 AKA Hell's House Mother	5 December 2021
284	Dorothea Puente Part 2	7 December 2021
285	The Murders of Nancy and Derek Haysom Part 1	20 December 2021
286	The Murders of Nancy & Derek Haysom Part 2	23 December 2021
287	The Murder of Betsy Faria Part 1	30 December 2021

=== 2022 ===
	Episode Title	Air Date
288	The Murder of Betsy Faria Part 2	1 January 2022
289	The Swamp Angel	4 January 2022
	Listener Tales 35	7 January 2022
290	The Tragic Murder of Phil Hartman	11 January 2022
291	The Purrington Massacre	15 January 2022
292	The Antifreeze Murders	19 January 2022
293	Where is Brandon Swanson? Part 1	23 January 2022
294	Where is Brandon Swanson Part 2	25 January 2022
295	The Mary Morris Murders	29 January 2022
296	James Rodney Hicks Part 1	2 February 2022
297	James Rodney Hicks part 2	4 February 2022
298	The Murder of Abraham Shakespeare	9 February 2022
	Bonus Episode! A Scream Chat With Radio Silence, Melissa Barrera & David Arquette	11 February 2022
	Listener Tales 36	14 February 2022
299	The Horrific Murder of Dorothy Eggers	17 February 2022
300	The Mysterious Murder of Christa Helm	22 February 2022
301	Haunted Lighthouses Volume 1	24 February 2022
302	Albert Fish Part 1	27 February 2022
303	Albert Fish Part 2	2 March 2022
304	Albert Fish Part 3	6 March 2022
305	Albert Fish Part 4	7 March 2022
	Listener Tales 37	11 March 2022
306	The St. Osyth Witch Trials	15 March 2022
307	The Grotesque Murders of Joel and Lisa Guy	20 March 2022
308	The Case of the Butterfly Man	22 March 2022
309	The Wonderland Murders Part 1	26 March 2022
310	The Wonderland Murders Part 2	28 March 2022
	Listener Tales 38	4 April 2022
311	Matthew Hoffman AKA The Leaf Killer	6 April 2022
312	Matthew Hoffman AKA The Leaf Killer Part 2	10 April 2022
313	The Unsolved Murder of Bonny Lee Bakley	13 April 2022
	Spooky Lighthouses Vol. 2	18 April 2022
	Spooky Games That Will Ruin Your Actual Life Vol. 2	20 April 2022
314	The Mysterious Disappearance of Dorothy Arnold Part 1	23 April 2022
315	The Mysterious Disappearance of Dorothy Arnold Part 2	26 April 2022
316	The Kreischer Mansion	2 May 2022
	Listener Tales 39 with special guests Sheena Melwani & TRID!	6 May 2022
317	The Horrific Murder of Katy Hawelka Part 1	9 May 2022
318	The Horrific Murder of Katy Hawelka Part 2	13 May 2022
319	The Somerton Man Part 1	17 May 2022
320	The Somerton Man Part 2	18 May 2022
	Spooky New Orleans Vol. 1	22 May 2022
	Listener Tales 40 New Orleans Edition!	24 May 2022
321	The Murder of Leith Von Stein	30 May 2022
	The Bermondsey Horror	31 May 2022
322	Spooky Castles Vol. 1	3 June 2022
323	The Case of Virginia Rappe	6 June 2022
324	The Tell-Tale Heart Murder	8 June 2022
	Listener Tales 41	9 June 2022
325	The Carnival Cult Murder	12 June 2022
326	Spooky Road Vol. 5	14 June 2022
327	Listener Tales 42	16 June 2022
328	The Circleville Letter Writer	19 June 2022
329	The Many Crimes of Serial Killer John Christie with Special Guest	21 June 2022
330	The Tragic Murder of Savanna LaFontaine Greywind	26 June 2022
331	Listener Tales: That Time I Met A Murderer	28 June 2022
332	Cryptids: The Flatwoods Monster & The Melonheads	28 June 2022
333	Brad's Bonkers Listener Tale	30 June 2022
334	The Unsolved Murder of Blake Tyler Chappell	3 July 2022
335	Solving The Decades Old Murder of Loretta Jones	5 July 2022
336	Listener Tales 43	8 July 2022
337	The Greenbriar Ghost	10 July 2022
338	Interview with Defense Attorney and Author of BONE DEEP, Joel Schwartz	13 July 2022
339	Listener Tales 44	14 July 2022
340	Following Up The Loretta Jones Case With Heidi Jones-Asay	18 July 2022
341	The Disappearance of Heidi Allen Part 1	20 July 2022
342	The Disappearance of Heidi Allen Part 2	21 July 2022
343	Jack the Ripper Part 1	25 July 2022
344	Jack the Ripper Part 2	27 July 2022
345	Listener Tales 45	28 July 2022
346	Jack the Ripper Part 3	31 July 2022
347	Jack the Ripper Part 4	3 August 2022
348	Listener Tales 46	5 August 2022
349	Jack the Ripper Part 5	8 August 2022
350	Haunted Hotels Vol. 1	10 August 2022
351	Listener Tales 47	11 August 2022
352	The Murder of William Desmond Taylor	15 August 2022
353	Justice For Katie Palmer	17 August 2022
354	Listener Tales 48	18 August 2022
355	Kelly Cochran AKA "The Devil Woman of Michigan"	22 August 2022
356	Spooky Lighthouses with Special Guests National Park After Dark Pod!	24 August 2022
357	Listener Tales 49 ft. Special Guest DREW!!	26 August 2022
358	Gerard John Schaefer "The Hangman"	29 August 2022
359	The Club Kid/Party Monster Murder	31 August 2022
360	Dueling Campfire Tales with Jordan from Nighttime Podcast!	2 September 2022
361	Listener Tales 50	5 September 2022
362	The Source Family	7 September 2022
363	New England Witches	12 September 2022
364	Terrifying Home Invasions - Listener Tale Edition	14 September 2022
365	Spooky Lakes Vol. 1	16 September 2022
366	JonBenet Ramsey Part 1	19 September 2022
367	JonBenet Ramsey Part 2	21 September 2022
368	BONUS EPISODE!!! The Butcher and the Wren discussion and preview	13 September 2022
369	Listener Tales 51	23 September 2022
370	Spooky Woods	26 September 2022
371	A Spooky Sit-down with Tobias Forge from Ghost!	28 September 2022
372	Listener Tales 52	30 September 2022
373	The Unsolved Murder of Marilyn Sheppard	3 October 2022
374	The Almost Valentines Day Massacre with Jordan from Nighttime Podcast	5 October 2022
375	Special Episode: Introducing The Rewatcher: Buffy the Vampire Slayer	7 October 2022
376	Spooky Castles Vol. 2 Chillingham & Himeji Castles	10 October 2022
377	The Towpath Murders	12 October 2022
378	Listener Tales 53	14 October 2022
379	The Tragic Case of Florence Maybrick	17 October 2022
380	The Supposed Diary of Jack the Ripper & Revisiting The Suspect List	19 October 2022
381	Listener Tales 54	21 October 2022
382	American Horror Stories with Alvin from Affirmative Murder!	24 October 2022
383	The Framing of Kelli Peters	26 October 2022
384	Listener Tales 55	28 October 2022
385	Terrifying HometownTales with Two Girls One Ghost!	31 October 2022
386	Fairy Lights, Witches & Curses OH MY!	2 November 2022
387	Listener Tales 56	4 November 2022
388	Halloween & The Original Hellfire Club with Cameron Esposito!	7 November 2022
389	The Murder of Ali Kamel Fahmy Bey	9 November 2022
390	Listener Tales 57	11 November 2022
391	The Butcher of Kingsbury Run Part 1	14 November 2022
392	The Butcher of Kingsbury Run Part 2	16 November 2022
393	Listener Tales 58	18 November 2022
394	Fred & Dolly Oesterreich	21 November 2022
395	The French Maid Killer Martin Dumollard	23 November 2022
396	Terrifying Amusement Parks with Holly Madison and Bridget Marquardt	25 November 2022
397	The Murder of Sherri Rasmussen	28 November 2022
398	True Crime & True Hauntings with Sam & Colby!	30 November 2022
399	Listener Tales 59: Australia & New Zealand Edition!	2 December 2022
400	The Murder of Molly McLaren	5 December 2022
401	The Violent Deaths of Bog Bodies	7 December 2022
402	Listener Tales 60	9 December 2022
403	The Yorkshire Ripper Part 1	12 December 2022
404	The Yorkshire Ripper Part 2	14 December 2022
405	Listener Tales 61: Across The Pond Edition	16 December 2022
406	The Yorkshire Ripper Part 3	19 December 2022
407	The Yorkshire Ripper Part 4	21 December 2022
408	Flesh Pedestrians, Demons & Summer Camp with Andrew from Let's Not Meet!	23 December 2022
409	Macabre Michigan with Paul Feig	26 December 2022
410	The Murder of Sophie Toscan du Plantier	28 December 2022
411	Listener Tales 62	30 December 2022

=== 2023 ===
	Episode Title	Air Date
412	The Tragic history and hauntings of Kenyon College	2 January 2023
413	The Senseless Murder of Pamela Vitale	4 January 2023
414	Listener Tales 63	6 January 2023
415	Theodore Durrant "The Demon in the Belfry" Part 1	9 January 2023
416	Theodore Durrant "The Demon in the Belfry" Part 2	11 January 2023
417	Listener Tales 64	13 January 2023
418	The Murders of Julie Crocker & Paula Menendez	16 January 2023
419	The Unbelievable Survival Tale of Juliane Koepcke	18 January 2023
420	Listener Tales 65	20 January 2023
421	The Torture and Murder of Cordell Richards	23 January 2023
422	The Murders of Billy Payne & Billie Jean Hayworth	25 January 2023
423	Listener Tales 66	27 January 2023
424	The Horrifying Crimes of Dellen Millard and Mark Smich	30 January 2023
425	The Clutter Family Murders	1 February 2023
426	Listener Tales 67	3 February 2023
427	The Brutal Hoia Baciu Forest	6 February 2023
428	The Survival Tale of Vicky Cilliers	8 February 2023
429	Listener Tales 68	10 February 2023
430	The Mysterious Disappearance of Theodosia Burr Alston	13 February 2023
431	Cryptids with Caleb!	15 February 2023
432	Glasgow Ice Cream Wars	20 February 2023
433	Candy Mossler	22 February 2023
434	Listener Tales 69	24 February 2023
435	Harvey Glatman "The Glamour Girl Slayer" Part 1	27 February 2023
436	Harvey Glatman "The Glamour Girl Slayer" Part 2	1 March 2023
437	Listener Tales 70	3 March 2023
438	The Tragic Murder of Roseann Quinn	6 March 2023
439	Kiss and Kill Murder	8 March 2023
440	Listener Tales 71	10 March 2023
441	The Burger Chef Murders Part 1	13 March 2023
442	The Burger Chef Murders Part 2	16 March 2023
443	The Horrific Murder of Marina Calabro with Jonathan Van Ness	20 March 2023
444	Rebecca Aylward	23 March 2023
445	The Murder of Kelly Ann Tinyes	27 March 2023
446	Listener Tales 72: Dream, Astral Projections & Alternate Dimensions	30 March 2023
447	Burke & Hare Part 1	3 April 2023
448	Burke & Hare Part 2	6 April 2023
449	The Murder of Daniel Brophy	10 April 2023
450	Arthur's Seat Coffins	13 April 2023
451	The Legend of Lavinia Fisher with RedHanded	17 April 2023
452	Doris Duke and the Murder of Eddie Tirella	20 April 2023
453	Curses: Micah Rood & The Omen	24 April 2023
454	That Time I Met A Murderer II ft. Bailey Sarian	27 April 2023
455	The Amato Family Murders	1 May 2023
456	The Bonebreaker Case	4 May 2023
457	H. H. Holmes Part 1	8 May 2023
458	H. H. Holmes Part 2	11 May 2023
459	H. H. Holmes Part 3	15 May 2023
460	H. H. Holmes Part 4	18 May 2023
461	H. H. Holmes Part 5	22 May 2023
462	Listener Tales 74 with Jon Lee Brody	25 May 2023
463	The Pamela Smart Case (Part 1)	29 May 2023
464	The Pamela Smart Case (Part2)	1 June 2023
465	The Devil Made Me Do It	5 June 2023
466	The Murder of Dawn Hacheney	8 June 2023
467	The Murder Of Elizabeth Riser & The Attempted Murder Of Brandi Hicks	12 June 2023
468	The Tragic Murder of Grace Millane	15 June 2023
469	Elroy Kent & The Murder of Delia Congdon	19 June 2023
470	The Murder of Mandy Stavik	22 June 2023
471	Joe Metheny	26 June 2023
472	Listener Tales 75	29 June 2023
473	Hayward Bissell and the Murder of Patricia Booher	3 July 2023
474	Denise Huber- Part 1	6 July 2023
475	Denise Huber- Part 2	10 July 2023
476	Bobby Mackey's Music World	13 July 2023
477	The Murder of Teresita Basa	17 July 2023
478	Michele Neurauter	20 July 2023
479	World's End Murders	24 July 2023
480	Listener Tales 76	27 July 2023
481	The Murder of Jennifer Corbin- Part 1	31 July 2023
482	The Murders of Jennifer Corbin and Dolly Hearn- Part 2	3 August 2023
483	The Alleged Smurl Family Haunting pt 1	7 August 2023
484	The Alleged Smurl Family Haunting pt 2	10 August 2023
485	The Jersey Devil Ft Jodie Sweetin	14 August 2023
486	The Murder of Sophie Lancaster	17 August 2023
487	Walter Freeman	21 August 2023
488	Walter Freeman Pt 2	24 August 2023
489	Rainbow Family Murders	28 August 2023
490	Listener Tales 77	31 August 2023
491	The Murder of Bridget Cleary	4 September 2023
492	The Haunted S.K. Pierce Mansion	7 September 2023
493	The Attempted Murder of Olga Rocco	11 September 2023
494	Jack Tupper Part 1	14 September 2023
495	The Horrific Murder of Jack Tupper- Part 2	18 September 2023
496	Half-Hanged Mary	21 September 2023
497	The Haunting of Doris Bither	25 September 2023
498	Listener Tales 78	28 September 2023
499	The Abduction of Betty and Barney Hill	2 October 2023
500	Eastern Air Lines Flight 401	5 October 2023
501	The Stanfield Hall Murders	9 October 2023
502	The Highgate Vampire	12 October 2023
503	The Torsåker Witch Trials	16 October 2023
504	The Sauchie Poltergeist aka Wee Hughie	19 October 2023
505	Leonarda Cianciulli: The Soap-Maker of Correggio	23 October 2023
506	Listener Tales 79	26 October 2023
507	A Conversation With Rachel Stavis, A Real Life Exorcist	30 October 2023
508	The Murders of Elisabeth Congdon and Velma Pietila	2 November 2023
509	Alvin and Judith Ann Neelley Part 1	6 November 2023
510	Alvin and Judith Ann Neelley Part 2	9 November 2023
511	Nan Patterson and The Death of Frank "Caesar" Young	13 November 2023
512	Nutty Putty Cave Incident	16 November 2023
513	Mamie Thurman	20 November 2023
514	Bernie Tiede and the murder of Marjorie Nugent	23 November 2023
515	The Murder of the Grimes Sisters	27 November 2023
516	Listener Tales 80	30 November 2023
517	The Black Sisters and the Murder of Ocey Snead	4 December 2023
518	Sharon Kinne- La Pistolera Pt.1	7 December 2023
519	Sharon Kinne- La Pistolera Pt.2	11 December 2023
520	Dudleytown: Connecticut's Cursed Ghost Town	14 December 2023
521	Velma Barfield	18 December 2023
522	The Mysterious Death of Christina Kettlewell	21 December 2023
523	Fan Favorite - The Dark Secrets Behind the Wizard of Oz	25 December 2023
524	Listener Tales 81	28 December 2023

=== 2024 ===
	Episode Title	Air Date
525	The Death of Joan Robinson Hill- Part 1	1 January 2024
526	The Death of Joan Robinson Hill- Part 2	4 January 2024
527	The Murder of Mary Stannard	8 January 2024
528	The Murders of Stan Farr and Andrea Wilborn	11 January 2024
529	Ann & Billy Woodward	15 January 2024
530	Prestin Castle and the Murder of Anna Corbin	18 January 2024
531	Tom Bird and Lorna Anderson Eldridge	22 January 2024
532	Listener Tales 82	25 January 2024
533	The Mysterious Death of Charles Morgan	29 January 2024
534	The Story of Laurie Bembenek and the Tragic Murder of Christine Schultz With Special Guest Holly Madison	1 February 2024
535	Florence Burns and the Murder of Walter Brooks	5 February 2024
536	The Murder of Gary Triano	8 February 2024
537	Ronald Dominique: The Bayou Strangler Part 1	12 February 2024
538	Ronald Dominique: The Bayou Strangler Part 2	15 February 2024
539	Ronald Dominique: The Bayou Strangler Part 3	19 February 2024
540	Anna George and the Murder of George Saxton	22 February 2024
541	The Unsolved Murder of Georgette Bauerdorf	26 February 2024
542	Listener Tales 83	29 February 2024
543	The Execution of Hamida Djandoubi with Special Guests Alvin and Fran From Affirmative Murder Podcast	4 March 2024
544	The Career Girl Murders Part 1	7 March 2024
545	The Career Girl Murders Part 2	11 March 2024
546	Matthew Wales and the Society Murders	14 March 2024
547	Lizzie Borden and other Dark Nursery Rhymes with Special Guests Sabrina and Corinne from Two Girls One Ghost	18 March 2024
548	The Lipstick Killer (Part 1)	21 March 2024
549	The Lipstick Killer (Part 2)	25 March 2024
550	Listener Tales 84	28 March 2024
551	Happy Land Social Club Arson	1 April 2024
552	Marie Robards	4 April 2024
553	Ed Gein: The Butcher of Plainfield (Part 1)	8 April 2024
554	Ed Gein: The Butcher of Plainfield (Part 2)	11 April 2024
555	Ed Gein: The Butcher of Plainfield (Part 3)	15 April 2024
556	The Santa Rosa Hitchhiker Murders	18 April 2024
557	The Glove Guy (With Jordan Bonaparte from The Night Time Podcast)	22 April 2024
558	Listener Tales 85	25 April 2024
559	The Murder of Timothy Coggins	29 April 2024
560	"Jolly Jane" Toppan: Angel of Mercy (Part 1)	2 May 2024
561	"Jolly Jane" Toppan: Angel of Mercy (Part 2)	6 May 2024
562	The Murder of Natalee Holloway	9 May 2024
563	A Deeper Look at the Crimes of Joran van der Sloot With Christopher Cassel	13 May 2024
564	Fred & Rose West (Part 1)	16 May 2024
565	Fred & Rose West (Part 2)	20 May 2024
566	Fred & Rose West (Part 3)	23 May 2024
567	Fred & Rose West (Part 4)	27 May 2024
568	Listener Tales 86	30 May 2024
569	"Weirdos' Audiobook Club" presented by Audible - Desperate Deadly Widows with Special Guest, Sheena Melwani	31 May 2024
570	The Murder of Jack Wilson	3 June 2024
571	Lost Children of the Alleghenies	6 June 2024
572	Heavenly Creatures: The Parker-Hulme Murder	10 June 2024
573	The Kidnapping & Murder of Marion Parker (Part 1)	13 June 2024
574	The Kidnapping & Murder of Marion Parker (Part 2)	17 June 2024
575	Veronica Gedeon & the Easter Sunday Murders (Part 1)	20 June 2024
576	Veronica Gedeon & the Easter Sunday Murders (Part 2)	24 June 2024
577	Listener Tales 87	27 June 2024
578	Clementine Barnabet & The Church of the Sacrifice & The Louisiana Axe Murders	1 July 2024
579	The Society Gang Killing	4 July 2024
580	Charles Whitman: The Texas Tower Sniper	8 July 2024
581	The Murder of Patricia Lonergan	11 July 2024
582	The Murder of Julia Martha Thomas	15 July 2024
583	Peter Manuel: The Beast of Birkenshaw (Part 1)	18 July 2024
584	Peter Manuel: The Beast of Birkenshaw (Part 2)	22 July 2024
	Hysterical	23 July 2024
585	Listener Tales 88	25 July 2024
586	The Murder of Bessie Darling	29 July 2024
587	The Hartford Circus Fire	1 August 2024
588	The Disappearance of Delimar Vera	5 August 2024
589	John George Haigh: The Acid Bath Murderer	8 August 2024
	Introducing GOSSIP's BRIDLE: A Chat with Spencer Henry & Madison Reyes!	10 August 2024
590	The Murder of Albert Snyder	12 August 2024
591	The Radium Girls	15 August 2024
592	Nellie May Madison: California's First Woman on Death Row	19 August 2024
593	Lee Roy Martin: The Gaffney Strangler	22 August 2024
594	The Disappearance of The Springfield Three	26 August 2024
595	Listener Tales 89	29 August 2024
598	"Weirdo's Audiobook Club" presented by Audible - My Best Friend's Exorcism with Special Guest, Sabrina from 2 Girls 1 Ghost!	30 August 2024
596	Spooky Lighthouses: Volume 4	2 September 2024
597	The Kidnapping of Barbara Jane Mackle	5 September 2024
599	The Kidnapping of Barbara Jane Mackle (Part 2)	9 September 2024
600	Winnie Ruth Judd: The Trunk Murderess	12 September 2024
601	The Strange Death of Cindy James	16 September 2024
602	The Strange Death of Cindy James (Part 2)	19 September 2024
603	The Mysterious Death of Tiffany Valiante	23 September 2024
604	Listener Tales 90	26 September 2024
605	The Stars Over Salem with Special Guest Alize Kelly	30 September 2024
606	The Oliver House Murders & Haunted Hotels	3 October 2024
607	Creepy Cemeteries: Volume 1	7 October 2024
608	The Snedeker Haunting: A Haunting in Connecticut	10 October 2024
609	The DeFeo Family Murder	14 October 2024
610	The Amityville Horror Conspiracy	17 October 2024
611	Preston Murr and the Boise Murder Mansion	21 October 2024
612	The House of Flying Objects: The Popper Poltergeist	24 October 2024
613	Latoya Ammons and the Demon house	28 October 2024
614	Listener Tales 61: HALLOWEEN Edition!	31 October 2024
615	Vampire Talk with Doug Jones	4 November 2024
616	Spooky Games That Will Ruin Your Actual Life Vol. 3 With Special Guest Bridget Marquardt from 'Ghost Bunny'	7 November 2024
617	Jerry Brudos: The Shoe Fetish Slayer (Part 1)	11 November 2024
618	Jerry Brudos: The Shoe Fetish Slayer (Part 2)	14 November 2024
619	Peter Bryan	18 November 2024
620	The Suspicious Kidnapping of Sherri Papini	21 November 2024
621	Fan Favorite: Bobby Mackey's Music World	25 November 2024
622	Listener Tales 92	28 November 2024
623	Fan Favorite: The Violent Deaths of Bog Bodies	2 December 2024
624	The Murder of Cheryl Perveler	5 December 2024
625	Albert Johnson: The Mad Trapper of Rat River	9 December 2024
626	James P. Watson: The Bluebeard Killer	12 December 2024
629	"Weirdos' Audiobook Club" presented by Audible - Blue Beard with Special Guest, Spencer Henry From Cult Liter	13 December 2024
630	Fan Favorite: The Unbelievable Survival Tale of Juliane Koepcke	23 December 2024
631	Case Revisit: The Lady of the Dunes	26 December 2024
632	The Suspected Crimes of Guy Muldavin	30 December 2024

=== 2025 ===
	Episode Title	Air Date
633	Listener Tales 93	2 January 2025
634	Michael and Suzan Carson: San Francisco Witch Killers	6 January 2025
635	Gordon Cummins: The Blackout Ripper (Part 1)	9 January 2025
636	Gordon Cummins: The Blackout Ripper (Part 2)	13 January 2025
637	The Bobbed Haired Bandit	16 January 2025
638	The Crash of Uruguayan Air Force Flight 571	20 January 2025
639	The Unsolved Murder of Melissa Witt	23 January 2025
640	Rodney Alcala: The Dating Game Killer (Part 1)	27 January 2025
641	Listener Tales 94	30 January 2025
642	Rodney Alcala: The Dating Game Killer (Part 2)	3 February 2025
643	Rodney Alcala: The Dating Game Killer (Part 3)	6 February 2025
644	A Sit Down with Chapman and Maclain Way, Directors of The Kings of Tupelo: A Southern Crime Saga	10 February 2025
645	The Disappearance of Bobby Dunbar	13 February 2025
646	The Unsolved Murder of Jeannette DePalma	17 February 2025
647	A Deeper Dive into the Murder of Elizabeth Short (Part 1)	20 February 2025
648	A Deeper Dive into the Murder of Elizabeth Short (Part 2)	24 February 2025
649	Listener Tales 95: Sleepover Edition	27 February 2025
650	Plagues of Hysteria with Andrew McMahon	3 March 2025
651	Jean Harris and the Murder of Herman Tarnower (Part 1)	6 March 2025
652	Diving into Skeletá with Tobias Forge of Ghost	7 March 2025
653	Jean Harris and the Murder of Herman Tarnower (Part 2)	10 March 2025
654	Spooky Lakes (Volume 2)	13 March 2025
655	The Sinking of the USS Indianapolis	17 March 2025
656	The Attempted Murder of Alison Botha	20 March 2025
657	Boston's Great Molasses Flood of 1919	24 March 2025
658	Listener Tales 96: Buhtz	27 March 2025
659	The Unsolved Murder of Kristin O'Connell	31 March 2025
660	Herbert Mullin: The Killer Hippie (Part 1)	3 April 2025
661	Herbert Mullin: The Killer Hippie (Part 2)	7 April 2025
662	The Exorcism of Roland Doe	10 April 2025
663	David Carpenter: The Trailside Killer (Part 1)	14 April 2025
664	David Carpenter: The Trailside Killer (Part 2)	17 April 2025
665	Robert Chambers: The Preppy Killer	21 April 2025
666	Episode 666 - Listener Tales of the Beast	24 April 2025
667	The Zodiac Killer (Part 1)	28 April 2025
668	The Zodiac Killer (Part 2)	1 May 2025
669	The Crimes of Robert Durst (Part 1)	5 May 2025
670	The Crimes of Robert Durst (Part 2)	8 May 2025
671	The Murder of Carol Stuart	12 May 2025
672	The Death of Ken McElroy, The Town Bully	15 May 2025
673	Spooky Asylums and Cemeteries with Nicholas	19 May 2025
674	The Norco Shootout	22 May 2025
675	The Life and Death of "Lobster Boy", Grady Stiles Jr.	26 May 2025
676	Listener Tales 98: Witches!	29 May 2025
677	The Murder of Anthony LoConte	2 June 2025
678	The Mad Bomber of New York (Part 1)	5 June 2025
679	The Mad Bomber of New York (Part 2)	9 June 2025
680	Frédéric Bourdin and the Disappearance of Nicholas Barclay	12 June 2025
681	Elmer McCurdy: The Outlaw Mummy	16 June 2025
682	The Murder of David Harris (Part 1)	19 June 2025
683	The Murder of David Harris (Part 2)	23 June 2025
684	Listener Tales 99: Campfire Tale Edition!	26 June 2025
685	Glen Helzer and the Children of Thunder (Part 1)	30 June 2025
686	Glen Helzer and the Children of Thunder (Part 2)	3 July 2025
687	The Last Call Killer (Part 1)	7 July 2025
688	The Last Call Killer (Part 2)	10 July 2025
689	The Crescent Hotel	14 July 2025
690	Paris catacombs, haunted accordions and more with Josh Homme	17 July 2025
691	The Bombing of United Air Lines Flight 629	21 July 2025
692	The Murder of Stephanie Scott	24 July 2025
693	Caryl Chessman: The Red Light Bandit	28 July 2025
694	Listener Tales 100: Bridal Edition!	31 July 2025
695	Linda Hazzard & Starvation Heights (Part 1)	4 August 2025
696	Linda Hazzard & Starvation Heights (Part 2)	7 August 2025
697	Possessed by Paperbacks: A Chat with Grady Hendrix	11 August 2025
698	Randy Kraft: The Scorecard Killer (Part 1)	14 August 2025
699	Randy Kraft: The Scorecard Killer (Part 2)	18 August 2025
700	Randy Kraft: The Scorecard Killer (Part 3)	21 August 2025
701	Spooky Games That Will Ruin Your Actual Life Vol. 4	25 August 2025
702	Listener Tales 101: Sleep Over / Dream Edition!	28 August 2025
703	The Kidnapping of Patty Hearst (Part 1)	1 September 2025
704	The Kidnapping of Patty Hearst (Part 2)	1 September 2025
705	The Kidnapping of Patty Hearst (Part 3)	4 September 2025
706	The Kidnapping of Patty Hearst (Part 4)	8 September 2025
707	The Tragic Death of Gloria Ramirez	11 September 2025
708	September Bonus Episode: Unknown Number: The High School Catfish	12 September 2025
709	The Enfield Poltergeist	15 September 2025
710	The Unsolved Death of Stephanie Washilisin	18 September 2025
711	Dialing the Dead: A Séance with Sam and Colby	22 September 2025
712	Listener Tales 102: Villains!	25 September 2025
713	The Horrific Crimes of the Aspirin Bandit	29 September 2025
714	The Manhattan Alien Abduction	2 October 2025
715	Forensics, Fiction, and the Fine Line Between Them: A Sit Down with Patricia Cornwell	6 October 2025
716	The Dartmouth College Murders	9 October 2025
717	October Bonus Episode - Corpse Medicine: Tomb to Table	10 October 2025
718	Esther Cox and the Great Amherst Mystery	13 October 2025
719	The Wyrick Family Haunting	16 October 2025
720	The Kidnapping of J. Paul Getty III	20 October 2025
721	MiniMORBID x 2: Cryptids of the Midwest	23 October 2025
722	Sallie the Man-Hater	27 October 2025
723	Listener Tales 103: Halloween 2025!	30 October 2025
724	The Hinsdale House Haunting	3 November 2025
725	Richard Speck: The Student Nurse Murders (Part 1)	6 November 2025
726	Richard Speck: The Student Nurse Murders (Part 2)	10 November 2025
727	Stars over Whitechapel with Special Guest Aliza Kelly	13 November 2025
728	November Bonus Episode: Twilight is Weird	14 November 2025
729	The Death of Cork Miller: Accident or Murder	17 November 2025
730	Listener Tales 104: Your Grandparents Might Be Criminals!	20 November 2025
	Episode Revisit: The Unexplained Death of Ellen Rae Greenberg	24 November 2025
	Episode Revisit: Fairy Lights, Witches & Curses OH MY!	27 November 2025
731	Emma Cunningham and the Murder of Harvey Burdell	1 December 2025
732	The Stallings Family Haunting	4 December 2025
733	The Onion Field Incident	8 December 2025
734	The Yogurt Shop Murders	11 December 2025
735	December Bonus Episode: Secrets of the S.K. Pierce Mansion with Special Guests Sam and Colby	14 December 2025
736	The Atlanta Ripper	15 December 2025
737	Listener Tales 105: Krampus Edition!	18 December 2025
	Episode Revisit: Santa's Dark Helpers	22 December 2025
	Episode Revisit: The Schoolbus Kidnapping of 1976	25 December 2025
738	The Shocking Murder of Terry King (Part 1)	29 December 2025

=== 2026 ===
	Episode Title	Air Date
739	The Shocking Murder of Terry King (Part 2)	1 January 2026
740	The Pizza Bomber Conspiracy	5 January 2026
741	The Mysterious Case of Sunny von Bülow	8 January 2026
742	The Sleeping Sickness Epidemic (1919-1930)	12 January 2026
743	Ricky Kasso: The Acid King	15 January 2026
744	The Murder of Kitty Genovese	19 January 2026
745	The Heaven's Gate Tragedy	22 January 2026
746	Lizzie Halliday	26 January 2026
747	Listener Tales 106: Comfy Queens	29 January 2026
748	January Bonus Episode: New Moon	30 January 2026
749	The "Hitman" Murders	2 February 2026
750	Dennis Nilsen: The Kindly Killer (Part 1)	5 February 2026
751	Dennis Nilsen: The Kindly Killer (Part 2)	9 February 2026
752	Dennis Nilsen: The Kindly Killer (Part 3)	12 February 2026
753	Mommy and Clyde: The Crimes of Sante and Kenny Kimes	16 February 2026
754	Amusement Park Disasters: Independent Parks	19 February 2026
755	Melissa Ann Shepard: The Internet Black Widow	23 February 2026
756	Listener Tales 107: You've got probed!	26 February 2026
757	February Bonus Episode: Smizing Through the Trauma	28 February 2026
758	The Murder of Olga Kupczyk (Part 1)	2 March 2026
759	The Murder of Olga Kupczyk (Part 2)	5 March 2026
760	The 1916 Jersey Shore Shark Attacks (Part 1)	9 March 2026
761	The 1916 Jersey Shore Shark Attacks (Part 2)	12 March 2026
	LIVE SHOW ANNOUNCEMENT: Radio City Music Hall!	16 March 2026
762	The Mysterious Disappearance of Zebb Quinn	16 March 2026
763	The Kidnapping of Charlie Lindbergh (Part 1)	19 March 2026
764	The Kidnapping of Charlie Lindbergh (Part 2)	23 March 2026
765	Listener Tales 108: 90's Tales!	26 March 2026
766	Haunted Roadtrip: West Virginia Edition!	30 March 2026
767	Morbid Book Club: Postmortem by Patricia Cornwell	31 March 2026
768	The Perron Family Haunting	2 April 2026
769	The Rescue of Baby Jessica McClure	6 April 2026
770	Tillie Klimek: Mrs. Bluebeard of Chicago	9 April 2026
771	Mad Madame Delphine LaLaurie	13 April 2026
772	Glennon Engleman: The Killer Dentist	16 April 2026
773	Move-In ready (To Ruin Your Life)	20 April 2026
774	The Man-Eaters of Tsavo	23 April 2026
775	April Bonus Episode: Eclipse	24 April 2026
776	The Disappearance of Amy Lynn Bradley	27 April 2026
777	Listener Tales 109: 80's Tales!	30 April 2026
778	True Crime: A Sit Down With Patricia Cornwell	4 May 2026
779	The Watts Family Murders (Part 1)	7 May 2026
780	The Watts Family Murders (Part 2)	11 May 2026
781	Episode Revisit: Torture	14 May 2026
782	Episode Revisit: The Survival Story of Mary Vincent, Patron Saint of Badassery	18 May 2026
783	The Matamoros Devil Murders (Part 1)	21 May 2026
784	The Matamoros Devil Murders (Part 2)	25 May 2026
785	Listener Tales 110: Playdates with the Paranormal	28 May 2026
786	May Bonus Episode: Breaking Dawn (Part 1)	29 May 2026
787	The Murder of Martha Moxley (Part 1)	1 June 2026
788	The Murder of Martha Moxley (Part 2)	4 June 2026
789	The San Ysidro McDonald's Massacre	8 June 2026
790	Dr. Ohta & the Killer Prophet	11 June 2026
791	The Pickwick Club Disaster	15 June 2026
792	Episode Revisit: The Radium Girls	18 June 2026
793	Amusement Park Disasters (Volume 2): Theme Parks	22 June 2026
794	Listener Tales 111: Camping Tales	25 June 2026
795	Morbid Book Club: Victorian Psycho By Virginia Feito	26 June 2026
796	Blanche Taylor Moore, The Oldest Woman on Death Row (Part 1)	29 June 2026
797	Blanche Taylor Moore, The Oldest Woman on Death Row (Part 2)	2 July 2026
798	The Green River Killer - Gary Ridgway (Part 1)	6 July 2026
799	The Green River Killer - Gary Ridgway (Part 2)	9 July 2026
800	The Green River Killer - Gary Ridgway (Part 3)	13 July 2026
801	The Green River Killer - Gary Ridgway (Part 4)	16 July 2026
802	Phantom Stalkers: The Halifax Slasher and the Hammersmith Ghost	20 July 2026
803	George Hassell: The Family Axeman	23 July 2026
804	Lorena and John Wayne Bobbitt	27 July 2026
805	Listener Tales 112: Vacation	30 July 2026
806	July Bonus Episode: Digging Into Exhumed with Aaron Mahnke	31 July 2026
807	The Unsolved Murders of Barry and Honey Sherman	2 Aug 2026
808	The Aum Shinrikyo Cult & the Tokyo Gas Attack	6 Aug 2026
809	Bonus Episode: Breaking Dawn (Part 2)	7 Aug 2026
810	Episode Revisit- Jack the Ripper (Parts 1-5)	10 Aug 2026
811	Episode Revisit- The Tragic Case of Molly Bish & Morbid Chats with Heather Bish	13 Aug 2026
812	The Hunt for John List (Part 1)	17 Aug 2026
813	The Hunt for John List (Part 2)	20 Aug 2026
814	The Unbelievable Disappearance of Angela Green	24 Aug 2026
815	Listener Tales 113: 90's Sleepover Edition!	27 Aug 2026
816	Let's Boogey: The Boogeyman Around the World (Vol. 1)	29 Aug 2026
817	The Stamford Bra Murders	31 Aug 2026
818	Killer in the Walls: The Crimes of Daniel LaPlante	3 Sept 2026
819	The Mysterious Death of Kathleen Peterson (Part 1)	7 Sept 2026
820	The Mysterious Death of Kathleen Peterson (Part 2)	10 Sept 2026
821	The Disappearance of Daniel Robinson	14 Sept 2026
822	The Murders of Mary Phagan and Leo Frank	17 Sept 2026

*Episode has since been removed from Spotify

Notes on Removed Episodes:

- Episode 31 "The Los Feliz Murder House" was removed and re-done as episode 221.
- Episode 36 "Tyler Hadley" was removed and re-done as episode 226.
- Episode 183 was removed from most platforms after controversy surrounding the apparently deliberate misgendering of the perpetrator who is trans. Kelly, whose partner is trans, offered an apology shortly after.

Other Notes:

- Prior to episode 325, "The Carnival Cult Murder", Listener Tales and Bonus Episodes were not counted towards the total episode list. After episode 325, all episodes were included in the official count.
- "Nicholas", who is referenced in some episodes, is the name given by Urquhart and Kelly to an entity they sometimes communicate with via a ghostbox. While initially included in Listener Tales, the ghostbox voice is edited out of some episodes on streaming services, though it remains included in others, as well as the video versions on YouTube.

== See also ==
- List of American crime podcasts
