= Matthew Hoffman =

Matthew Hoffman may refer to:

- Mat Hoffman (born 1972), American BMX rider
- Matthew Hoffman (murderer) (born 1980), American convicted murderer
- Matthew Hoffman (TV host), television host
- Matthew Hoffman (artist) (born 1979), American public artist
