= Zando =

American independent publisher

- Status: Active
- Founded: 2020
- Founders: Molly Stern
- Country of origin: United States
- Headquarters location: New York City
- Distribution: Penguin Random House (U.S.)
- Imprints: Zando, Zando Young Readers, SJP Lit, Gillian Flynn Books, Crooked Media Reads, Sweet July Books, Atlantic Editions, Get Lifted Books, Hillman Grad Books, Slowburn, Tin House
- Official website: www.zandoprojects.com

Zando is an American independent publisher based in New York City. Zando publishes literary fiction, non-fiction and young adult books. The company consists of imprints Zando, Zando Young Readers, SJP Lit, Gillian Flynn Books, Crooked Media Reads, Sweet July Books, Atlantic Editions, Get Lifted Books, and Hillman Grad Books.

== History ==
The company was founded in 2020 by Molly Stern, a former publisher at Crown. Zando is known for partnering with high-profile individuals, companies and brands to publish and promote books. Zando is distributed by Penguin Random House.

In 2024, Zando launched the romance imprint Slowburn. The inaugural title was Brynne Weaver's Leather & Lark, the second installment in the Ruinous Love trilogy, which became an instant New York Times best seller.

In 2025, Zando acquired publisher Tin House.

In 2026, Zando launched the horror imprint Evil Twin. First titles published under the imprint include A.P. Thayer’s Tapeworm and Abe Moss's Morsels.

== Publishing ==
Authors published by Zando include Samantha Allen, Steve Almond, Karamo Brown, Margot Douaihy, Maurene Goo, and Liv Little, among others.

Zando's publishing partners include Sarah Jessica Parker, The Atlantic, Ayesha Curry, Gillian Flynn, Lena Waithe, John Legend, and Crooked Media.

In 2022, Zando published Morbid co-host Alaina Urquhart's bestselling novel The Butcher and the Wren.
