= Celia Cooney =

American robber (1904–1992)

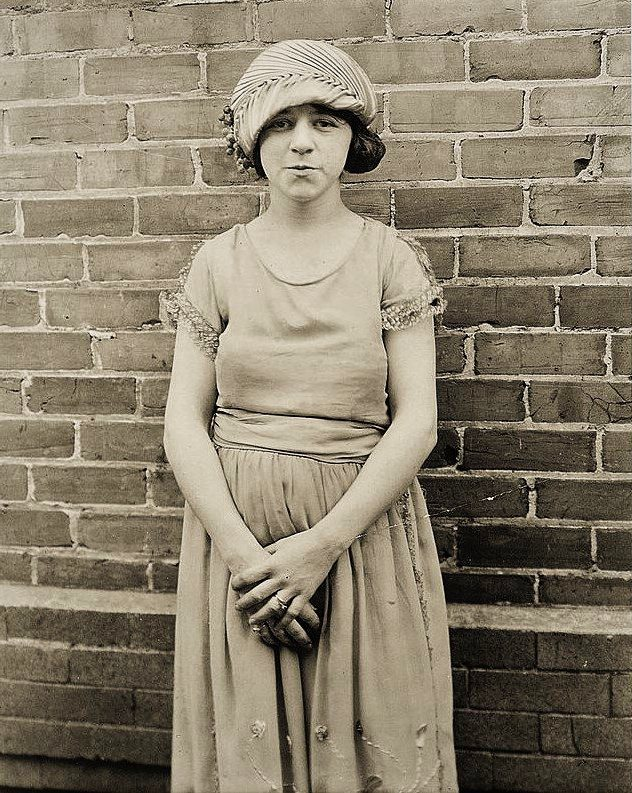
- Cooney in 1924
- Born: 1904
- Died: July 13, 1992 (aged 87–88)
- Other name: The Bobbed Haired Bandit
- Spouses: Ed Cooney (m. 1923; died 1936) Harold La Grange (m. 1943)
- Criminal charge: Robbery
- Penalty: 20 years
- Time at large: 65 days

Details
- Date: January 5 - April 1, 1924
- State: New York
- Date apprehended: April 21, 1924
- Imprisoned at: Auburn Prison

Celia Roth Cooney (1904 – July 13, 1992) was an American who went on a robbing spree in the spring of 1924 in New York City. Along with her husband, Ed Cooney, Cooney robbed 10 businesses before they were caught. She became known as the Bobbed-Haired Bandit for her exploits. The robberies received significant media coverage, making headlines in The New York Times, the Washington Post, Chicago Tribune, San Francisco Chronicle, the Los Angeles Times, and others. The newspapers pilloried commissioner Richard Enright and the New York City Police Department for their inability to catch Cooney. In response, Enright ordered the largest manhunt in the city's history.

Cooney and her husband evaded capture for 65 days, eventually fleeing to Florida after a botched robbery of the payroll office of the National Biscuit Company. While in Florida, she gave birth to a child, who died several days later. She and her husband were caught on April 21, 1924, and both were sentenced to twenty years in prison, of which she served seven. After leaving prison, she spent the rest of her life in relative obscurity, dying in 1992.

== Early life ==
Celia Cooney was born in 1904 in New York City. In 1922, she met Ed Cooney, with whom she fell in love. The wedding took place on May 18, 1923. Ed Cooney was a mechanic at the Ostrander Corporation, and Celia Cooney worked at a laundry. After their marriage, Celia became pregnant.

== Robberies ==
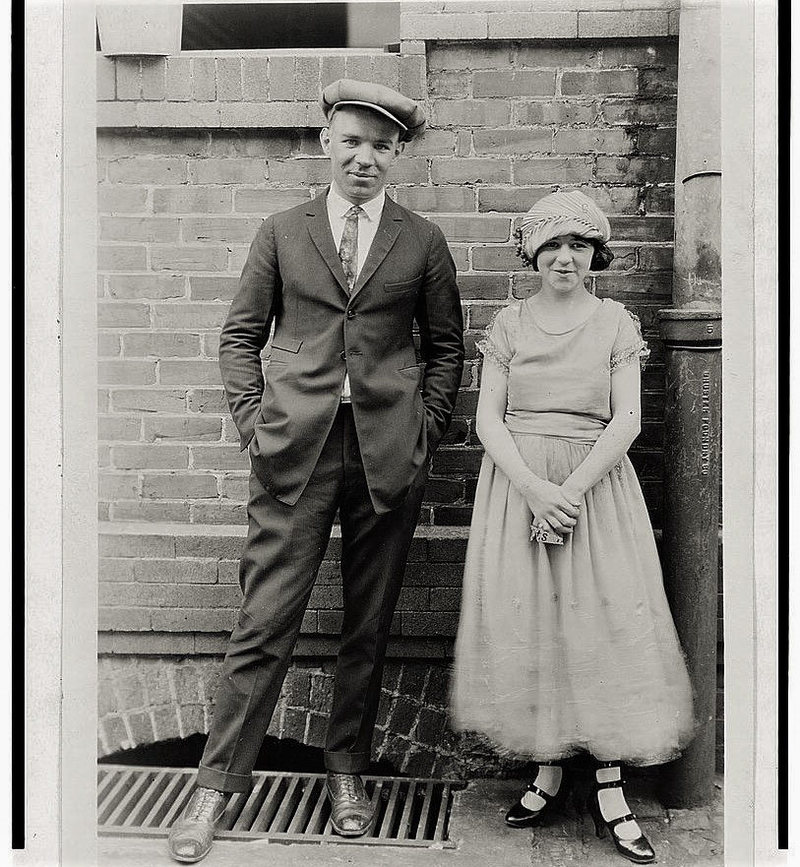
Cooney with her husband Ed in 1924

Her first robbery took place on January 5, 1924, when Cooney and her husband entered a Thomas Ralston grocery in Park Slope, and asked for a dozen eggs. They subsequently held up the store and stole a total of 680 dollars. The robbery received a smattering of coverage in the Brooklyn Eagle and Brooklyn Citizen. Celia and Ed Cooney soon moved to 1099 Pacific Street. They spent the money quickly and subsequently robbed an Atlantic and Pacific at 451 Ralph Avenue, and a H. C. Bohack store. In total, they netted about $365 from the two robberies. The New York Daily News and Telegram and Evening Mail covered the robberies, with the Mail coining the nickname "bobbed-hair bandit."

The robberies began to attract media attention, with newspapers ridiculing Richard Enright for his inability to catch the bandit and her husband. On January 14, Enright announced that he had caught the bandit. He claimed that it was Helen Quigley, a twenty-three year old actress. Cooney subsequently left a message at a drugstore on Dekalb Avenue: "You dirty fish-peddling bums, leave this innocent girl alone and get the right ones, which is nobody else but us ... We defy you fellows to catch us." Another robbery occurred on Union Street on January 20. The various robberies were covered on front pages in the Daily News, Brooklyn Standard Union, Eagle, Citizen, New York Post, New York Journal-American, The New York Times, and others. At least one poem was written about the robberies.

Enright continued to be heavily criticized for his inability to catch the Cooneys as they robbed more stores. As the robberies continued, Enright stepped up his efforts to catch Cooney, naming Mary Cody and Rose Moore as suspects. F. Scott Fitzgerald would later claim that his wife Zelda Fitzgerald had been accused of being the Bobbed-Haired Bandit, being stopped on Queensboro Bridge in Queens. The newspapers continued to cover the chase, with the New York Herald and others comparing Cooney to a modern-day Robin Hood. Enright soon assembled 850 detectives and made catching Cooney his top priority, giving the detectives permission to shoot on sight. Despite having an additional 200 policemen on patrol, the Cooneys still evaded capture.

Enright eventually established a group of eight detectives known as the "bobbed-hair squad" that included William Casey, Frank Gray, Joseph McCarthy, Joseph Owens, Peter Mathers, and Charles Motjenacker, tasked solely with catching the Cooneys. On March 5, he ordered half of his reserve police force in Brooklyn to aid the detectives in stopping Cooney. That same night, she and her husband robbed another drugstore and again evaded capture. With the search intensifying, the Cooneys laid low for much of the rest of March, even as the news continued covering the daring duo.

The robberies that the couple were pulling off, while drawing much attention, were often only bringing in just barely enough to survive on. In order to secure their financial well-being, the couple planned to rob the payroll office of the National Biscuit Company warehouse. The robbery occurred on April 1, 1924. They held up the cashier, Nathan Mazo, and several employees. Mazo attempted to stop the robbery, and Ed Cooney, believing Celia had been hurt, shot him. The couple fled, leaving $8,000 behind in the open safe.

The Cooneys departed New York on a Clyde Line steamer and travelled to Florida. In New York City, the failed robbery set off a large manhunt, but the police failed to find them. On April 3, they arrived in Jacksonville, Florida. The Cooneys' baby was born on April 10 and died within two days. On April 15, the police disclosed the identity of Celia and Ed Cooney to the public, and on April 21, 1924, at 1:00 in the morning, the couple was arrested in Jacksonville by new New York detectives assisted by local police.

== Capture and trial ==
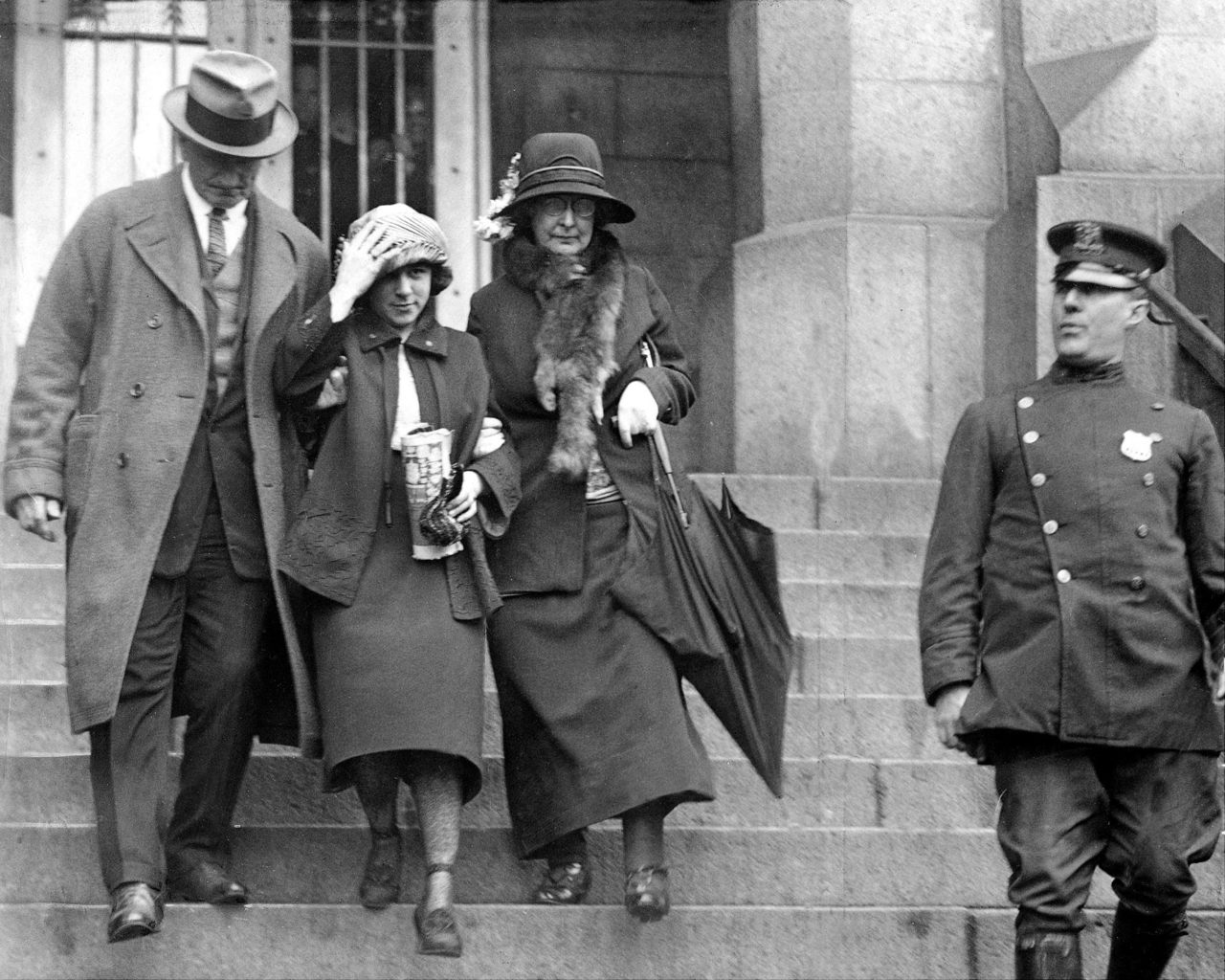
Cooney leaving the courthouse, May 8, 1924

The capture of the Bobbed-Haired Bandit made the front page of many New York City newspapers, as well as the Washington Post, Chicago Tribune, San Francisco Chronicle, and the Los Angeles Times. As she and her husband were brought up to New York City for their trial, thousands of people turned out to see Celia as their train passed. When she arrived in New York City, a large crowd greeted her. The New York World described the crowd: "Neither Presidents nor Jack Dempsey had attracted such a throng to Pennsylvania station as Celia Cooney, Brooklyn's Bobbed Haired Bandit and her husband Edward did when they reached this city at 3:30." She was tried in Jefferson Market Courthouse, and sentenced to twenty years in prison. She spent her time in Auburn Prison.

== Later life ==
Ed Cooney had his fingers smashed in a machine while in prison and his arm was eventually amputated below the elbow. Weakened, he developed tuberculosis and died in 1936. Before his death, Ed filed a $100,000 lawsuit in 1931 against New York state because of the loss of his arm. His lawyers, Samuel S. Leibowitz and Jacob Shientag, won the case, granting a settlement of $12,000 to the family. The couple were released on October 16, 1931. Celia Cooney spent the rest of her life in relative obscurity, working as a typist and later at Sperry Gyroscope. She married Harold La Grange in 1943 and died on July 13, 1992. Cooney's exploits would soon enter popular culture, with lectures, plays, and songs featuring her story. In December 2021, true crime comedy podcast My Favorite Murder released an episode covering Cooney's story. In January 2025, true crime comedy podcast Morbid featured an episode covering Cooney's story. In October, 2025, Maryka Biaggio released a novel about the Cooneys' robbery spree titled Gun Girl and the Tall Guy.

== Bibliography ==
- Biaggio, Maryka. (2025). Gun Girl and the Tall Guy. London, UK: Pegasus Publishers.
- Duncombe, Stephen; Mattson, Andrew (2006). The Bobbed Haired Bandit. NYU Press – via Project MUSE.
- Mahon, Elizabeth K. (2021). “Celia Cooney: The Bobbed Haired Bandit.” In Pretty Evil: True Stories of Mobster Molls, Violent Vixens, and Murderous Matriarchs. Guilford, CT: Globe Pequot, pp. 157–174.
