= Killing of Brenda Schaefer =

1988 murder in Louisville, U.S.

- Location: 38.2227°N 85.7231°W; Louisville, Kentucky, U.S.
- Date: September 24, 1988
- Attack type: Rape, beating, poisoning
- Weapon: Chloroform
- Accused: Mel Ignatow; Mary Ann Shore
- Convictions: Ignatow: Federal; Perjury; Subornation of perjury Making false statements Kentucky; Perjury; Shore: Tampering with evidence

On September 24, 1988, 36-year-old Brenda Schaefer was abducted, raped, and killed in Louisville, Kentucky, United States. The crime had been carried out by her 50-year-old ex-fiancé Mel Ignatow and his 38-year-old girlfriend Mary Ann Shore, with the latter cooperating with authorities in exchange for a lesser charge by implicating Ignatow as the main perpetrator.

Ignatow was acquitted of Schaefer's murder in 1991, after a jury found Shore's testimony unconvincing. Less than a year later, Ignatow admitted to killing Schaefer after physical evidence was found at his home. Under the legal principle of double jeopardy, he could not be tried a second time for the murder. However, Ignatow was convicted and sentenced to a combined 17 years in prison, of which he served nearly 10 years, for several instances of perjury in his grand jury testimony for the case, in which he had repeatedly and falsely proclaimed his innocence.

== Background ==
=== Brenda Schaefer ===
Brenda Sue Schaefer was born on April 25, 1952, in Louisville's St. Joseph neighborhood, as the youngest of six children to Essie (née Downs) and John Schaefer. She grew up in nearby St. Matthews, with her family operating a summer camp out of a log cabin near Harrods Creek. In 1971, shortly before her graduation from Waggener High School, Schaefer became engaged to her highschool sweetheart Charles "Pete" Van Pelt. The wedding was called off on May 2, 1971, when Schaefer's older brother Jack, a police officer, was gunned down in Smoketown after intervening in an attack on his patrol partner Wilbur Hayes. The two attackers, brothers Michael and Narvel Tinsley, were arrested four days later and sentenced to death that same year. Schaefer and Van Pelt subsequently married in December 1971 and moved to Clarksville, Indiana.

Schaefer worked as a sales clerk and attended training to become a nurse's aide while Van Pelt continued his job as a police dispatcher. According to Van Pelt, Schaefer was extremely shy and "terrified" of having physical intimacy beyond kissing and cuddling. The couple divorced on March 23, 1976, after around four years of marriage, due to arguments over Van Pelt's low income and spending habits. In early 1978, Schaefer entered a stable relationship with Jim Rush, a Louisville-area dentist. The couple remained together for eight years, during which Rush suggested that Schaefer had hypoactive sexual desire disorder, but eventually agreed to separate in August 1986, citing Schaefer's emotional issues and Rush's functional alcoholism. Schaefer maintained good relationships with both Van Pelt and Rush. Schaefer worked as a trained X-ray technician for William Spalding, a friend of Jim Rush, at the time of her death.

In the months leading up to Schaefer's death, her family was negatively affected by other events. Schaefer's teenage niece Jennifer Hayes was killed in a traffic collision on August 17, 1988, and on September 16, Michael and Narvel Tinsley were released on parole for the murders of Jack Schaefer and Wilbur Hayes.

=== Mel Ignatow ===
Melvin Henry Ignatow was born on March 26, 1938, in Philadelphia, Pennsylvania, as the second of three children to Virginia (née Gerdelmann) and David Ignatow. Ignatow was baptized in accordance with his mother's Catholic faith, but raised Orthodox Jewish, his father's religion. The family moved to Louisville during World War II, where Ignatow's parents ran several successive businesses, mostly grocery stores, each of which failed financially and led to the family filing bankruptcy. During Ignatow's teenage years, the family briefly relocated to Washington, Indiana, for nine months to run another grocery store that ultimately closed down. Upon returning to Louisville, Ignatow attended Atherton High School and joined the Young Men's Hebrew Association. Ignatow briefly enrolled at the University of Louisville, but dropped out without picking an academic major and instead worked for his father as a jeweler, finding employment at Medco Jewelry Company and later at Rosalco as a buyer, with a yearly income of between $50,000 to $80,000.

Ignatow married Sharon Kippen on May 27, 1960, in Jeffersonville, Indiana. The couple had three children before divorcing on March 18, 1973. Kippen later stated that Ignatow was emotionally abusive, left the family several times for "time on his own" and spent most of the family's income on buying luxury items only he could use, including a Corvette and two Pontiac Grand Prix cars. During their thirteen-year marriage, Ignatow became known for his "hedonistic tendencies", showing off his wealth, joining singles clubs, and openly having extramarital affairs. During the divorce proceedings, Ignatow was allowed to retain their house, all household items and savings, as well as custody of their children.

Afterwards, Ignatow entered a brief relationship with Mary Ann Shore, a co-worker at his workplace, largely based on Ignatow's claim he could make her thinner through "sexercise", but he eventually broke up with her. Despite this, they maintained a sexual relationship, with Shore acting as a babysitter to Ignatow's children while he was away on weeks-long trips to China, Taiwan, and Japan as part of his job as a traveling salesman. According to friends, Ignatow was known as a con artist who greatly exaggerated his wealth and made far-fetched claims such as working for the CIA.

=== Relationship ===
Only a few days after Schaefer's break-up with Jim Rush, she was introduced to Ignatow by a friend during a double date. Ignatow was noted as being significantly older and less physically attractive than Schaefer, but she had been drawn to him due to his willingness to listen to her and financial stability he offered. Their relationship was nevertheless described as "frigid" by Ignatow, with the pair only meeting on weekends. In spite of this, Ignatow proposed to Schaefer in December 1986, but was turned down. She accepted a second proposal on February 14, 1987, five months after their first meeting.

After becoming engaged, Ignatow exerted increasing control over the relationship, demanding that Schaefer, who was devoutly Catholic, participate in anal intercourse, group sex, and bondage. While at work, Ignatow expected Schaefer to be available via phone at specific times, screaming at her if she ever deviated from this. At home, Ignatow was easily enraged whenever Schaefer failed to abide by his meticulous rules, such as tearing toilet paper incorrectly or turning off water faucets without putting them in an even position, causing Schaefer to sleep primarily at her mother's house. In December 1987, Ignatow became more irritable after he was fired from his job at Rosalco and had to live off his pension of $48,000 (equivalent to $136,028 in 2025). Throughout early to mid 1988, Schaefer's demeanor became more nervous and her performance at work worsened. She confided Ignatow's abuse to family and friends, telling them that he forced Schaefer to take "sex tablets", which resulted in her losing consciousness and awakening nude. Schaefer recalled a specific incident during a motel stay in Gatlinburg, Tennessee, where she had once awoken to find Ignatow leaning down at her with a chlorofom-soaked rag, which he claimed was to "help her sleep". In the weeks preceding her murder, Schaefer began being less compliant with Ignatow's demands after a friend recommended her the self-help book Women Who Love Too Much. At the same time, Ignatow continued to meet Shore for sex, though telling her that he and Shore were no longer dating. Shore developed a dislike for Schaefer over being "dumped", with Ignatow continuing to speak more favorably of Schaefer's appearance and sexual performance compared to Shore whenever they were together.

== Murder ==
=== Preparation ===
Ignatow knew that Schaefer was planning to break off their relationship over his abuse. He asked his former girlfriend, Mary Ann Shore, to help him plan and carry out the murder. They spent several weeks making extensive preparations. Shore testified they had "scream tested" her house and dug a grave in the woods behind it. Schaefer told Ignatow about the break-up two days before her murder. Shore claimed that Ignatow framed the later murder as a "sex therapy" meeting to help mend the relationship between Schaefer and Ignatow, and that the grave was only meant to be a scare tactic. For the act, Ignatow prepared gloves, duct tape, rope, several plastic bags, a bottle of chloroform, a wooden fraternity paddle, a camera, extra roll film, an electric vibrator, and lubricant jelly.

On September 22, 1988, a day after the break-up, Ignatow called Schaefer's workplace. A colleague answered the call and after overhearing Ignatow becoming increasingly hostile, Schaefer took the receiver and said "I told you to never call me again". Despite this, the pair agreed to meet up again for a final time so Schaefer could return several gifts of jewelry and a fur coat to Ignatow. Schaefer told family of her sister-in-law of this meeting and said that Ignatow may have followed her home after the call. The same day, she had made plans to give the former relationship with her ex-husband Jim Rush a second chance, with a date in planning for the day after she met with Ignatow.

=== Day of the crime ===
During the afternoon of September 24, Schaefer picked up Ignatow in her car from his home. After she gave back the gifts, Ignatow and Schaefer had a meal at a Gold Star Chili restaurant, where he told Schaefer that he knew someone who would buy the jewelry. The two drove to Shore's house in Poplar Level, arriving at around 6:00 p.m. Sitting on a couch together, Ignatow explained his "sex therapy" idea, arguing that "she [Schaefer] needed to have this because she was just very cold-natured and he needed that sex". Schaefer tried to leave but Ignatow physically kept her seated, all the while checking off steps on a written list. Eventually, Ignatow forced Schaefer against a wall and told her to undress while Shore took photographs. Schaefer was then blindfolded, gagged, and tied a table in the living room, where Ignatow sodomized Schaefer for over two hours, with Shore continuing to take pictures at Ignatow's command.

During the night, Schaefer was relocated to Shore's bedroom, where she was tied to the frame of the bed. Schaefer was orally raped by Ignatow, who instructed Shore to beat Schaefer and digitally penetrate Schaefer's rectum. When Ignatow began striking Schaefer with a paddle, Shore relented and left the room. Eventually, Ignatow held a rag with chloroform over Schaefer's face until she stopped breathing. To ensure her death, Ignatow strangled her with a rope, which he left tied around her neck.

Afterwards, Ignatow told Shore that Schaefer had died. Shore looked into the bedroom to find Schaefer's body still tied up. With Shore's aid, Ignatow wrapped Schaefe's body in garbage bags and buried her in the prepared hole in the woods behind Shore's house. Ignatow loaded the vibrator and camera, as well as any leftover tape and rope into the trunk of Shore's vehicle before puncturing a tire on Schaefer's car. With Shore following behind him, Ignatow drove Schaefer's car across Interstate 64, where he left it offroads near Breckenridge Lane.

== Investigation ==
Schaefer's car was found in the morning hours of September 25, 1988, by the St. Matthew Police Department. According to the officer who found the car, Tom Gilsdorf, besides the flat tire, the rear window had been broken and the built-in radio was stolen, also reporting what appeared to be blood on the backseat and the car's exterior. A few hours later, Schaefer was separately reported missing by her parents, with her brother, Tom Love, telling investigators of his suspicions regarding Mel Ignatow due to his abusive behavior. Detective Jim Wesley questioned Ignatow the same day at his home, reading Wesley and his officers pre-prepared notes on the events of that day. Police remained suspicious of Ignatow since he showed no emotion, with his story later conflicting with other people's accounts. Ignatow refused to take a polygraph test, citing a weak heart. During a second audio-recorded meeting at the office of Ignatow's attorney Charlie Ricketts, Ignatow spent the first minutes crying before returning to his usual monotone, implicating Schaefer's exes by saying that her ex-boyfriend Jim Rush had a substance addiction and falsely claiming that her ex-husband Pete Van Pelt had been stalking her.

The Kentucky Rescue Association spent eighty hours searching the Ohio River for Schaefer's body. By January 1989, the family and Schaefer's employer William Spalding had offered $25,000 (equivalent to $68,057 in 2025) for any information on Schaefer's whereabouts, with an open post office box for anonymous tips to be left. The following month, a colleague of Schaefer told police of Ignatow's hairstylist, Lauren Lechleitner, who happened to know Mary Ann Shore. Shore had told the hairstylist about Ignatow's controlling behavior and her frustrations about the end of their relationship. Detective Jim Wesley also found out that Shore had taken the day off of a scheduled babysitting job on the day of Schaefer's disappearance and along with the FBI, he believed Shore may have been involved in Schaefer's murder. During questioning, Shore declined to talk further after failing a polygraph test. After the polygraph, officers followed her out of the police station and took her back for interrogation when she was seen walking together with Ignatow. She was pressed to give the "full story" but still refused to talk. On February 14, 1989, Shore was arrested for five previously outstanding check fraud charges, but released on bail.

Ignatow was openly named as a central suspect, but he protested his innocence on March 5, 1989, in the Courier-Journal. On March 22, Ignatow received a threat letter demanding he reveal the location of Schaefer's dead body or face "execution by a gang of Cubans". In August 1989, the letter was traced to Schaefer's boss William Spalding, who was subsequently convicted of terroristic threat and fined $300 (equivalent to $779 in 2025).

In early January 1990, Shore was called to testify in front of a grand jury regarding Schaefer's disappearance, during which she first claimed to have met Schaefer only once, but later contradicted herself by inquiring in response to a question by U.S. Attorney Scott Cox if he meant "the last time" Shore had seen her. On January 9, 1990, Shore confessed to the FBI that she was present during Schaefer's murder, and to taking pictures of Ignatow as he tortured and abused Schaefer. FBI and Jefferson County investigators were led to the grave site by Shore, where Schaefer's badly decomposed body had been buried for over a year. The autopsy showed she had been abused, but any DNA evidence, from blood and semen, had become unusable for testing.

The investigators convinced Shore to wear a listening device, by promising only to charge her with tampering with evidence. In the surveillance, Shore told Ignatow that the FBI was hounding her and she was afraid the property behind her house was being sold and developed. He was on tape berating her for letting the FBI "rattle" her and told her he didn't care if they dug up the whole property because "that place we dug is not shallow."

== Murder trial ==
Based on this recording, Ignatow was tried for murder, kidnapping, sodomy, sexual abuse, robbery, and tampering with evidence, between early 1990 and December 1991. In one section of the recorded conversation between Ignatow and Shore, in which Ignatow stated, "That place we dug is not shallow. Beside that one area right by where that site is does not have any trees by it," the jury decided that Ignatow said "safe," not "site," as police believed. This led the jurors to conclude that the discussion involved a buried safe. During the proceedings, Shore was excused from the trial between June 1990 and May 1991, as she was unable to speak properly due to Bell's palsy and was also getting married during this time. Furthermore, Shore, the prosecution's star witness, wore a tiny miniskirt to court and laughed during her testimony, undermining her credibility in the eyes of the jury. The defense argued that Shore, not Ignatow, had killed Schaefer. The defense had also repeatedly sought to remove Jefferson County Commonwealth Attorney Ernest Jasmin from the case for including the FBI tape. Ignatow's trial was originally set for November 13, 1991, but in the final month, proceedings were moved outside the Louisville/Jefferson County area, to Kenton County where far less publicity had been generated.

On December 22, 1991, after six hours and fifteen minutes of delibration, the jury acquitted Ignatow. One juror stated after the trial, "The reason he was found not guilty was there was not one shred of evidence that connected him to the crime. Nothing. We don't know if Mel did it or not. What we do know is there was no proof of it". Another juror stated that Shore's testimony appeared to be based on animosity due to Ignatow's refusal to marry her. The judge was so embarrassed by the verdict that he took the unusual step of writing a letter of apology to the Schaefer family. Schaefer's parents died before the trial began. According to some family and friends, their deaths were premature due to the heartbreak and stress of Schaefer's murder.

After testifying in Ignatow's trial, Mary Ann Shore-Inlow pleaded guilty to tampering with evidence on December 2, 1991. On January 8, 1992, a federal grand jury indicted Ignatow for perjury and inducing Shore to commit perjury.

== Aftermath ==
=== Perjury trials ===
On October 1, 1992, a carpetlayer working in Ignatow's old house, which had been sold to fund his defense, pulled up a length of carpet in a hallway. Under it he found a floor vent containing a plastic bag, taped to hold it inside the vent. Inside the bag was the jewelry Schaefer had taken with her on the night of her disappearance, and three rolls of undeveloped film. When developed, the film showed Ignatow torturing and raping Schaefer, just as Shore had described. Ignatow's face was not in the pictures, but body hair patterns and moles matched him perfectly.

Ignatow faced federal charges for perjury and lying to the FBI, based on his grand jury testimony. Knowing that he could not be retried for the murder because of double jeopardy, Ignatow confessed in court at his perjury trial. He turned to Schaefer's brothers in court and said he had killed her, but claimed that she had died peacefully. In October 1992, Ignatow pleaded guilty. He faced a maximum of 15 years in prison, albeit his agreement called for a term ranging from 8 to 10 years. Ignatow was sentenced to eight years and one month in prison.

On October 23, 1997, Ignatow was indicted on state perjury charges. He was released from federal prison on October 31, 1997. The state later prosecuted him on perjury charges for testimony he gave in a case against Schaefer's employer, Dr. William Spalding, for threatening to kill Ignatow if he did not reveal where Schaefer was. Spalding had been convicted of terroristic threatening and fined $300 after Ignatow falsely proclaimed that he and Schaefer had parted on good terms. He was sentenced to nine years in prison for perjury as a second degree persistent felony offender in January 2002. Ignatow's sentence was reduced for time served.

=== Imprisonment and release ===
In April 2002, Ignatow was denied release on shock probation. He converted to Christianity during his incarceration and unsuccessfully appealed beginning December 2002. Ignatow was denied release a final time in June 2003, after described his perjury during the Schaefer murder trial as "self defense". He was originally slated for release in December 2007, but released early for a second time on December 1, 2006, after serving four years, on good behavior and prison work, during which he became a trained mechanic. He returned to Louisville, living in a home 4 miles (6.4 km) from the house where he murdered Schaefer.

Brenda Sue Schaefer is buried in her family's plot in Cave Hill Cemetery in Louisville.

Mary Ann Shore was sentenced to five years imprisonment for her role in Schaefer's killing. She was released for good behavior after serving three and died of heart disease in 2004, aged 54.

On September 1, 2008, Ignatow was found dead in his apartment. He was 70 years old. An autopsy determined that Ignatow died from an accidental fall that lacerated his head or his arm, and had eventually bled to death. The neighbor who found his body stated that "It just looked like he had fell... and he tried to go to the kitchen, and there was a blood trail that way, and then it looked like he tried to make it to his room, before he made it to his room, that's where they found his body at."

Ignatow's neighbor also described him as "a sick and elderly man, alone and struggling for help when he apparently stumbled to his death. I used to hear him all night, asking for Jesus to come get him, because he was in a lot of pain." Ignatow's son admits, "He will probably go down as one of the most hated men in Louisville... Maybe it'll just put it to rest, that we all don't have to keep dealing with this over and over. That's what I hope."

== Media ==
Author Bob Hill wrote the 1995 true crime book Double Jeopardy exploring the case, which became a bestseller and provoked widespread interest in the case. MSNBC and CourtTV also produced television documentaries.

The television series American Justice aired the death of Brenda Schaefer titled "Getting Away with Murder", season 9, episode 7 original air date March 15, 2000.

Investigation Discovery series, Evil Lives Here (S10 Ep4), had an episode about the case titled "He Got Away With Murder", which originally aired on August 8, 2021.
