= Ronald Dominique =

American serial killer (born 1964)

- Born: Ronald Joseph Dominique; January 9, 1964 (age 62); Thibodaux, Louisiana, U.S.
- Other name: "The Bayou Strangler"
- Conviction: First degree murder (8 counts)
- Penalty: Eight consecutive life sentences without the possibility of parole

Details
- Victims: 23+
- Span of crimes: 1997–2006
- Country: United States
- State: Louisiana
- Date apprehended: December 1, 2006
- Imprisoned at: Louisiana State Penitentiary

Ronald Joseph Dominique (born January 9, 1964), known as The Bayou Strangler, is an American serial killer and rapist who murdered at least 23 men and boys in the state of Louisiana between 1997 and 2006. On September 23, 2008, Dominique was found guilty and sentenced to several terms of life imprisonment without parole for his crimes. Following his conviction, the Federal Bureau of Investigation (FBI) stated that Dominique's was the most significant serial homicide case in the country over the past two decades in terms of both death toll and duration.

Despite the number of victims, Dominique's arrest received little publicity outside of the state media.

== Biography ==
Ronald Joseph Dominique was born on January 9, 1964, in Thibodaux, Louisiana, the youngest of six children. His parents were poor laborers who lived in a trailer park located on the outskirts of the city. He attended the local Thibodaux High School. During his school years, Dominique was known for his melancholic temperament, lack of communication skills and weight problems. These, coupled with low self-esteem and poor health, made him the target of bullying. Despite singing in the school choir, Dominique was considered an unpopular social outcast since he didn't play sports, didn't do drugs or drink alcohol. Shortly before leaving school, Dominique discovered that he was gay, and visited a local gay bar several times. However, some of his classmates had seen him there, resulting in harassment. Dominique vehemently denied accusations of being homosexual.

He graduated from high school in 1983; because of his family's financial circumstances, Dominique had lived out his childhood and adolescence in poverty. After leaving school, he entered the Nicholls State University, where he studied computer science. However, he quickly lost interest and dropped out in the mid-1980s.

=== First offenses ===
On June 12, 1985, Dominique was arrested on charges of sexual harassment committed via telephone, for which he had to pay a $75 fine. Because of his lack of education, Dominique was forced to engage in low-skilled labor for the following years, and struggled to hold down jobs due to disciplinary issues. Unwilling to keep a steady job for a long period of time, he survived by living off relatives and other people's income, most notably his mother and older sister, living with each of them for a time. He was arrested for drunk driving in May 1994 and was fined for the offense.

Two years later, on August 25, 1996, a partially naked male youth jumped out of the window of the residence of Dominique's sister, where he lived at the time, and told neighbors that Dominique had raped and attempted to kill him. Dominique was arrested and his bail set at $100,000. When the case was transferred to the court, the prosecutor's office was unable to locate the alleged victim or establish his identity, eventually resulting in the case's dismissal in November of that year. A man of small stature, Dominique later claimed to investigators that he was targeted and sexually assaulted by certain prisoners while incarcerated for this offense.

On February 10, 2002, Dominique was arrested again, this time for assaulting a woman in Terrebonne Parish during a Mardi Gras festival. Ronald claimed that the woman had hit a baby stroller in one of the parking lots due to her dangerous driving, after which he began an argument with her, demanding an apology. After the woman apologized, he punched her in the face. He was charged, but the case was later dropped, after an agreement of reconciliation was reached between him and the woman, with whom he had made amends.

As a gay man, Dominique was unmarried and had no children, preferring to spend most of his free time in gay bars, often dressed as singer Patti LaBelle, of whom he was a great fan. Dominique was unable to establish a serious relationship and was often looked down upon by the local gay community.

== Murders ==
Dominique's victims tended to be teenagers and men aged between 16 and 46, but not all of them were homosexual. Most of the victims were African-American. He often met them during walks or drives in his pickup truck, as well as in gay bars, luring them with offers of alcohol, drugs, housing, or group sex with his supposed girlfriend. After successfully convincing potential victims, Dominique would lure them to his trailer where he would overpower them, bind them, and subsequently rape them. According to the investigators, Dominique then strangled them, loaded their bodies into the back of his truck, and dumped them in remote rural areas in one of six nearby parishes.

The murders began in July 1997, with Dominique's first confirmed victim being a 19-year-old African American man named David Mitchell. He was picked up while hitchhiking alone from his grandmother's house after attending a relative's birthday party. His body was found on July 14 in a ditch along a highway, near a wooded area in St. Charles Parish, two days after he was last seen. Forensic research showed that there was ditch water in David's lungs but no trace of physical trauma, drugs, or alcohol.

His death was initially ruled as accidental drowning. However, Mitchell's father insisted that his son was an excellent swimmer and that he had been murdered since the water level was low and the fact that Mitchell's trousers had been lowered to his ankles when found. After Dominique's later confessions, the deceased's relatives denied that he was gay, used drugs, or had financial troubles.

Dominique's next two murders also took place in the St. Charles Parish. The first was in December 1997, when he strangled 20-year-old Gary Pierre. His body was found fully clothed, with no signs of physical trauma or drugs found in his system. The second killing occurred on July 31, 1998, when he killed a 38-year-old vagrant named Larry Ranson. Ranson was the first victim subjected to bondage by Dominique.

In early October 1998, Dominique met 27-year-old Oliver LeBanks in Metairie. After his arrest, he claimed that LeBanks offered him sexual services in exchange for money, after which Dominique had sex with him, then beat and strangled him. LeBanks's body was later disposed of on the outskirts of Metairie, where it was found on October 4. During the autopsy, traces of Dominique's semen was found on Oliver's body. Relatives and friends of LeBanks later confirmed that he had only recently resorted to this lifestyle after he had been fired from his job for using drugs.

In October 1998, he met 16-year-old Joseph Brown in Kenner and lured him into his truck. Dominique beat the teenager several times on the head with a blunt object and then strangled him with a plastic bag. A month later, 18-year-old Bruce Williams fell victim to Dominique in similar circumstances. In May 1999, Dominique was cruising around Kenner when he came across 21-year-old Manuel Reed. Dominique lured him into his truck, where he raped and then strangled Reed, later dumping his corpse in a dumpster in the city's industrial zone, about a mile from where Brown's body was found. Similar to LeBanks, semen traces were found which belonged to an unknown male.

A month later, Dominique killed 21-year-old Angel Mejia. At first, the killer tried to dump Meija's corpse in a dumpster, but after discovering that it was full he discarded it on the street. After examining the corpse, the coroner concluded that the victim had been tied up with a rope prior to his death. While investigating the killings, law enforcement established that Mejia, Brown, and Pierre all lived in close proximity to each other.

In late August, Dominique met 34-year-old Mitchell Johnson. He took Johnson to the forest outside Metairie, where he tied, raped, and strangled him. Mitchell's fully nude body was discovered on September 1.

In January 2000, Dominique claimed another victim, 23-year-old Michael Vincent, in Lafourche Parish. In early October, he became closely associated with 20-year-old Kenneth Randolph Jr., who lived near him in a trailer park. Dominique lured Randolph into his trailer and then attacked and murdered him. He then took the body to a field outside the city, where the partially naked remains were found on October 6. On October 12, 2002, in the late evening, Dominique met 26-year-old Anoka Jones on the streets in Houma. He attacked Jones, after which he tied up, raped, and strangled him. Dominique later dumped his body under a highway overpass, where it was discovered several hours later.

In late 2002, Dominique and his sister moved to the rural unincorporated community of Bayou Blue. There, he found a job as a specialist who checked electricity levels at a local power supply, which allowed him to periodically travel. Around this time, Dominique killed 19-year-old Datrell Woods, dumping both him and his bicycle in a reed field. Woods's decomposed and partially naked body remained undiscovered until May 24, 2003. The cause of death was deemed as asphyxiation; however, until Dominique's arrest, it was considered to be accidental in nature, since the victim was known to suffer from asthma.

In October 2004, Dominique lured 46-year-old Larry Matthews to his house, but during the process Matthews lost consciousness, after which Dominique raped and strangled him. He later dumped Matthews's body twenty miles away from the crime scene. Nobody initially reported Matthews as missing since he was homeless, and his identity later had to be established via fingerprints. Dominique's next victim – his first white victim – was 21-year-old Michael Barnett, whose body was found on October 24, 2004.

In February 2005, Dominique murdered 22-year-old Leon Lirett, who had previously lived with two other victims – Barnett and Anoka Jones – and was considered the prime suspect in Jones' murder, as he was the last person to see him prior to the former's disappearance. Two months later, in April, Dominique met 31-year-old August Watkins, who he lured to his truck. After Watkins ended up in his trailer, Dominique tied him up, raped, and strangled the victim. After Watkins's corpse was discovered, police finally began to consider for the first time that a serial killer was active in Kenner and Houma, since the murders in both areas demonstrated a strikingly similar modus operandi. The case was handed over to the Federal Bureau of Investigation (FBI).

A few days after killing Watkins, Dominique killed 23-year-old Kurt Cunningham. Later that summer, he murdered 28-year-old Alonzo Hogan in St. Charles Parish and 17-year-old Wayne Smith in Terrebonne Parish. Hogan had been raped by Dominique pre-mortem, while no traces of semen were found on Smith's corpse since his body had been disposed of in a canal, where it had severely decomposed when discovered only a few days later.

In September 2005, Dominique murdered 40-year-old Chris Deville, who was trying to hitchhike out of Napoleonville following Hurricane Katrina. He later dumped Deville's corpse in a reed field. His skeletal remains were discovered the following month and identified by relatives, thanks only to ID cards and other personal belongings left beside the body. In late November, Dominique killed 21-year-old Nicholas Pellegrin in Lafourche Parish. During the investigation into his death, Pellegrin's relatives told the police that shortly before his death, the deceased man borrowed $400 from local drug dealers and had missed the payment date, after which he began to receive death threats. Therefore, prior to Dominique's capture, Pellegrin's death was wrongfully thought to be drug-related.

Dominique's last confirmed victim was 27-year-old Christopher Sutterfield. He had met Dominique in the summer of 2006, after which the two began supposedly dating. On October 14, while on a date together in Iberville Parish, Dominique hit Sutterfield on the head with a heavy object, causing him to lose consciousness. After finding his body, police interviewed Sutterfield's relatives, friends, and acquaintances, all of whom confirmed they had last seen him with a man driving a black SUV, but they were unable to describe his companion's appearance.

== Exposure ==
In November 2006, Dominique came under police suspicion after Ricky Wallace, a resident of Bayou Blue, reported that Dominique had lured him to his trailer in mid-2006 with an offer to share drugs and have sex with a girl. After Wallace entered the trailer, according to his testimony, Dominique tried to convince him that his girlfriend enjoyed bondage, offering to tie Wallace up. Ricky refused, and soon after he was allowed to leave. His testimony was questioned at first; nevertheless, Dominique was questioned by police. While he was held at the station, Dominique agreed to donate a blood sample.

Over the next week, DNA testing matched Dominique's profile with that of the elusive killer who had left behind semen traces on the bodies of Oliver LeBanks and Manuel Reed, resulting in an arrest warrant. On December 1, 2006, Dominique was arrested at a homeless shelter. After said arrest, he told police that he knew it was a matter of time before he was captured, so he had moved out of his sister's house in order not to inconvenience her.

Once at the police station, Dominique expressed his desire to cooperate with investigators and readily confessed to 23 murders, describing them with details known to only officers. As a result, charges were brought against him. Despite his confession, Dominique refused to admit guilt in the attacks. He stated that many of his victims had voluntarily agreed to be tied, handcuffed, and treated similarly since they wanted to earn money. If the potential victim refused to do so, he let them go without harming them.

Concerning his motive, Dominique claimed that he wanted to get rid of any witnesses as he was unwilling to serve a prison sentence again. According to him, after his 1996 arrest for rape, he was strongly impacted, allegedly remaining in constantly negative emotional states, and even began to show symptoms of a mental disorder.

== Trial ==
After accepting a plea bargain from prosecutors, on September 24, 2008, the court found Dominique guilty on all charges and sentenced him to eight life imprisonment terms without parole. Dominique had avoided the death penalty by pleading guilty to all charges and is incarcerated at the Louisiana State Penitentiary in Angola.

== Victims ==
| Number | Name | Age | Date found | Location found |
|---|---|---|---|---|
| 1 | David Mitchell | 19 | July 1997 | St. Charles Parish |
| 2 | Gary Pierre | 20 | December 1997 | St. Charles Parish |
| 3 | Larry Ranson | 38 | July 31, 1998 | St. Charles Parish |
| 4 | Oliver LeBanks | 27 | October 1998 | Metairie, Jefferson Parish |
| 5 | Joseph Brown | 16 | October 1998 | Kenner, Jefferson Parish |
| 6 | Bruce Williams | 18 | November 1998 | Jefferson Parish |
| 7 | Manuel Reed | 21 | May 1999 | Kenner, Jefferson Parish |
| 8 | Angel Mejia | 34 | June 1999 | Kenner, Jefferson Parish |
| 9 | Mitchell Johnson | 34 | August 1999 | Metairie, Jefferson Parish |
| 10 | Michael Vincent | 23 | January 2000 | Lafourche Parish |
| 11 | Kenneth Randolph Jr. | 20 | October 2002 | Lafourche Parish |
| 12 | Anoka Jones | 26 | October 12, 2002 | Houma, Terrebonne Parish |
| 13 | Datrell Woods | 19 | May 24, 2003 | Bayou Blue, Terrebonne Parish |
| 14 | Larry Matthews | 46 | October 2004 | Bayou Blue, Terrebonne Parish |
| 15 | Michael Barnett | 21 | October 24, 2004 | Bayou Blue, Terrebonne Parish |
| 16 | Leon Lirette | 22 | February 2005 | Bayou Blue, Terrebonne Parish |
| 17 | August Watkins | 31 | April 2005 | Lafourche Parish |
| 18 | Kurt Cunningham | 23 | April 2005 | Lafourche Parish |
| 19 | Alonzo Hogan | 28 | July 2005 | St. Charles Parish |
| 20 | Wayne Smith | 17 | August 2005 | Terrebonne Parish |
| 21 | Chris Deville | 40 | September 2005 | Assumption Parish |
| 22 | Nicholas Pellegrin | 21 | November 2005 | Lafourche Parish |
| 23 | Christopher Sutterfield | 27 | October 2006 | Iberville Parish |

Of these murders, Dominique pleaded guilty to killing Barnett, Lirette, Watkins, Cunningham, Hogan, Deville, Smith and Pellegrin.

== Bibliography ==
- Jack Rosewood; Rebecca Lo (February 3, 2007). Serial Killers Rage and Horror: 8 Shocking True Crime Stories of Serial Killers and Killing Sprees - "Chapter 8. Ronald Dominique The Bayou Strangler." CreateSpace Independent Publishing Platform. ISBN 9781542957786.
- Robert Keller (March 11, 2017). True Crime: American Monsters Volume 12: 12 Horrific American Serial Killers - "Chapter 8. Ronald Dominique." ISBN 9781544618487
- Fred Rosen (October 3, 2017). The Bayou Strangler: Louisiana's Most Gruesome Serial Killer. Open Road Media. ISBN 978-1504039499.
- Al Camino (September 10, 2018). Serial Killers: True Stories of the World's Worst Murderers. Arcturus Publishing. ISBN 978-1789502664.

== In media ==
- Documentary film, Bayou Blue 2011.
- Killer Profile made an episode (S01E04) about the case in 2013
- The killings were recreated in S03E08 of the show called Killers: Behind the Myth in 2015.
- In 2022, the Oxygen Network original series Mark of a Killer made an episode about the case (named: The Bayou Strangler).
- In 2022, A&E TV series First Blood aired an episode about Ronald's childhood and his murderous spree.

== See also ==
- List of serial killers in the United States
- List of serial killers by number of victims
