= Ocey Snead =

American murder victim

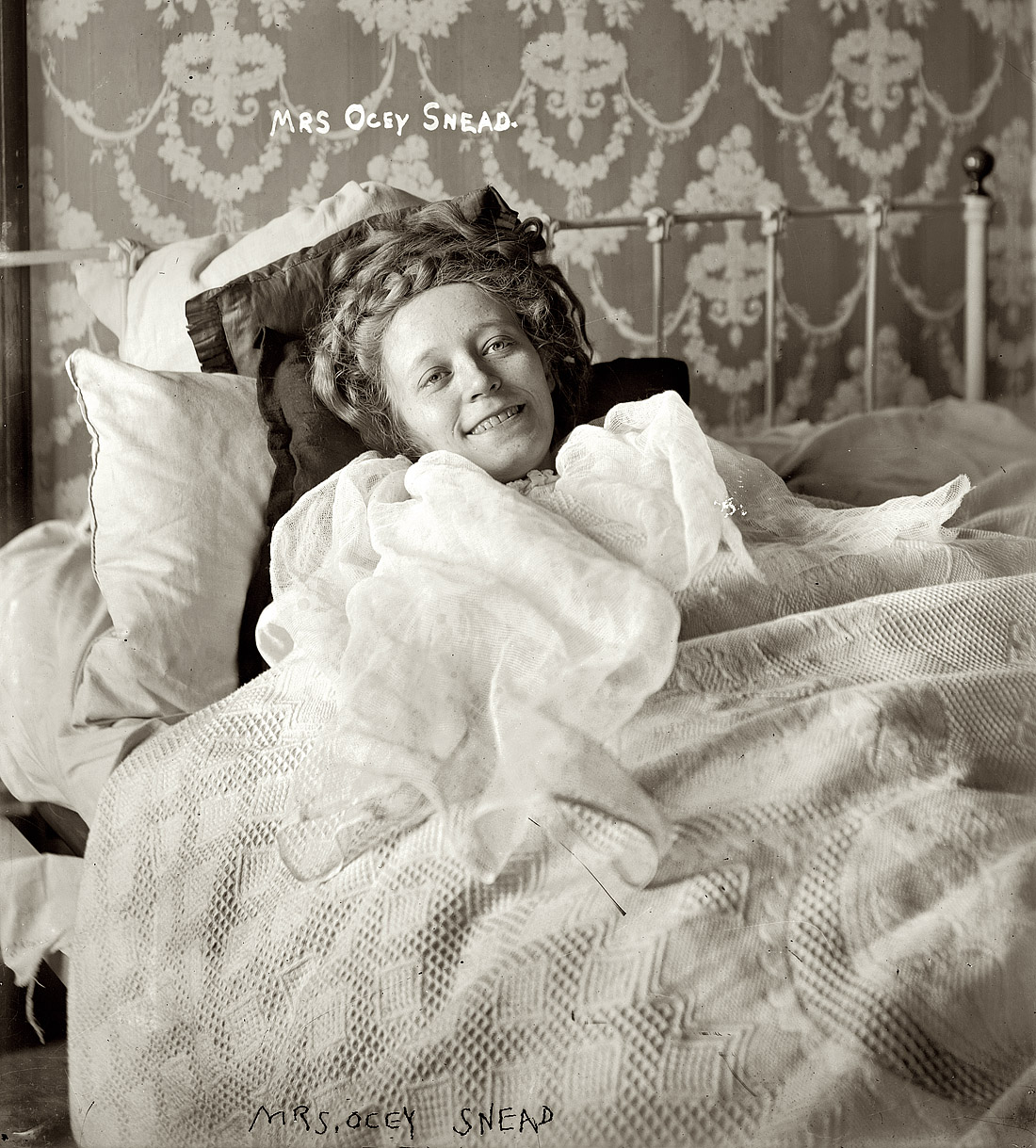
- Snead on December 21, 1907
- Born: Oceana Wardlaw Martin; September 1885; Manhattan, New York, US
- Died: November 29, 1909 (aged 24); East Orange, New Jersey, US
- Cause of death: Murder by drugging and drowning
- Resting place: Mount Hope Cemetery, Westchester County, New York
- Spouse: Fletcher Wardlaw Snead
- Children: 2

Ocey Snead

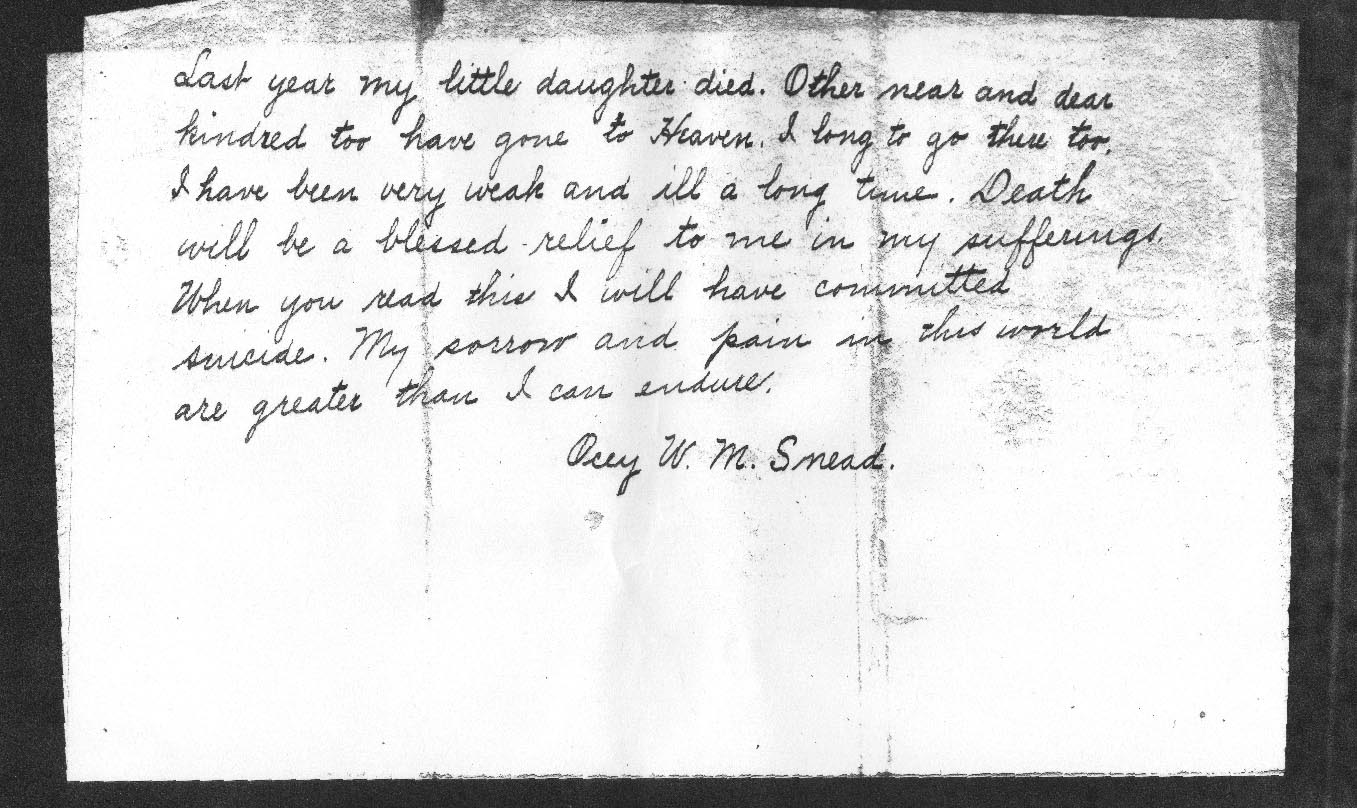
Ocey Snead suicide note

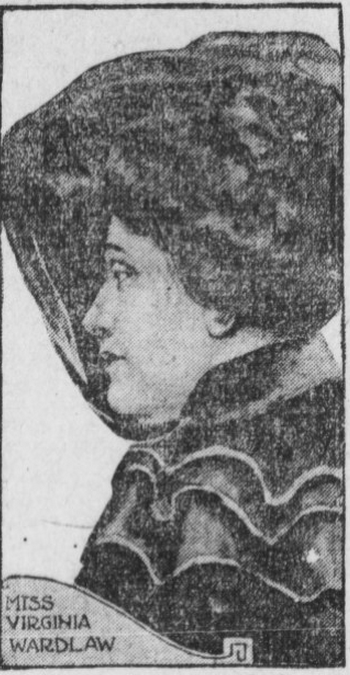
Virginia Oceana Wardlaw (1852–1910)

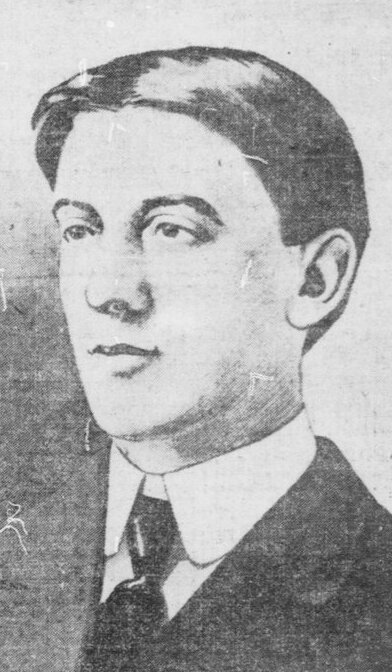
Fletcher Wardlaw Snead (1875–1955)

Oceana Wardlaw Martin Snead (September 1885 – November 29, 1909) also known as Ocey Snead, was an American woman who was drugged and drowned in East Orange, New Jersey by her own family to collect $32,000 (equivalent to $820,000 in 2025) in insurance money.

== Birth and family ==
Oceana was born in September 1885, probably in New York City, to Caroline Belle Wardlaw (1848–1913), and Colonel Robert Maxwell Martin, who had fought for the Confederacy in the American Civil War. Her mother had a career in education, at one point being removed from a position for unstable behavior. Ocey was the common accepted nickname in that time for Oceana.

Caroline Belle Wardlaw had three sisters. Mary Elizabeth Long Wardlaw (1849–1937) married Fletcher Tillman Snead (1829–1891). Together they produced a son, Fletcher Wardlaw Snead (1875–1955), who was Ocey's first cousin and would become her husband. The second sister was Virginia Oceana Wardlaw (1852–1910), who never married. Both sisters were also involved in education and were also implicated in Ocey's murder. The third sister, who was not implicated in the death, was Bessie Gertrude Wardlaw (1867–1954) who married Richard Spindle (1855–1928). There were two brothers. John Banks Wardlaw (1854–1881) who was a journalist and also taught at the Christiansburg school with his aunt and sisters and married Mary Elizabeth "Lizzie" Davidson (1857–1880). Both John and Lizzie died in Christiansburg while John was working at the school as an English Language professor. The second brother was Albert Goodall Wardlaw (1856–1936), a reverend who married Harriett Lee Field; he wasn't involved with the school.

The siblings were the children of Martha Elizabeth Wardlaw, née Goodall (1828–1910), and John Baptist Wardlaw (1817–1896), a minister and South Carolina Supreme Court justice. Caroline, Mary, and Virginia were known for dressing in black and behaving secretively. Several strange deaths followed the women in their later lives.

== Marriage ==
Ocey married Fletcher Wardlaw Snead, her first cousin, in Louisville, Kentucky in 1906. The wedding took place in secret because the family was originally opposed to the union. A second ceremony was held on January 13, 1908, at Jersey City, New Jersey after the sisters had been "won over", shortly before the birth of their first child. Together they had two children: Mary Alberta Snead (1908); and David Pollock Snead (1909–1910). Fletcher was the son of Mary E. Long Wardlaw and Fletcher Tillman Snead and he had two siblings: John Wardlaw Snead (1878 – February 1906) and Albert Charles Snead (1880–1978). In 1880 Fletcher was living in Oglethorpe, Georgia, with his parents. Fletcher was previously married to Vashti Gordon McLaurin (1872–1953) who was born in Old Lynnville, Tennessee. Fletcher and Vashti had one child together: Robert Tillman Snead (1900–1954). Vashti moved to Muskogee, Oklahoma by 1920; by 1930 she was living in West Palm Beach, Florida with her son. She returned to Tennessee and died there, while her son remained in Florida and raised a family.

After they received word that Ocey was pregnant, the three sisters chased her to Canada and sent her against her will to Brooklyn, New York. Subsequent to this, Ocey's mother told her that Fletcher had died. In fact, Fletcher was alive and well and in contact with his mother and aunts.

== Montgomery College ==
Montgomery College, originally established in 1853 as the Montgomery Collegiate Institute, located in Christiansburg, Virginia, was founded and owned by the Christiansburg Presbyterian Church, and operated out of the old Church building on the corner of 1st and Franklin Streets. In 1860, a new school was built on the present site, and renamed Montgomery Female Academy. Oceana Seaborn Goodall Pollock, Martha Eliza Wardlaw's sister, purchased the school in 1876, when it was sold at public auction, and while she was a teacher at the school. The 1880 Census shows Mrs. Pollock and her niece Virginia Wardlaw, nephews John B and Albert G Wardlaw all living at the school, with Virginia listed as a teacher there. Within a year, John and his wife Lizzie would be dead, both in their 20s. Virginia and Mary returned to Tennessee shortly after that. They returned to Virginia shortly after 1900. Virginia's younger sister, Bessie Spindle, was already living in the area with her husband, Richard, a prominent local businessman, and in 1900 was the Principal at the Academy. Around this time, Mrs. Pollock, aged and infirm, deeded the school to her sister, Martha Wardlaw and niece Virginia. Virginia and Mary had inherited the real property of their father, and mother Martha had received all the cash, so there was money to apply to the school. They renamed it Montgomery Female College. All was well for a time; the school's dormitories were refurbished, the curriculum updated, and Virginia had returned to her love of teaching. Soon, however, Mary Snead arrived, followed by two of her sons, Fletcher and John. The trio's arrival created no problems. However, when Caroline Martin arrived, accompanied by her daughter Ocey, things swiftly went awry as Caroline took over administration of the school. She made sudden changes to the curriculum, moved students from one classroom to another for no apparent reason, and instilled suspicion and secrecy by installing up to three padlocks on some doors. All three sisters took to roaming the halls, surprising the residents with their sudden appearances.

Fletcher and John moved to Lynnville, Tennessee, opening a sawmill together and courting the women who would become their wives in a double wedding, both daughters of a prominent local lawyer named J. R. McLaurin. John married Anna Laird McLaurin in 1903, and Fletcher had married her sister, Vashti in 1899. Around 1906, Caroline Wardlaw visited John in Lynnville and insisted that John return with her to Christiansburg to teach at the school. John's wife pleaded with him to stay, and he refused his aunt's demands, even having police remove her from his house. He told his neighbors he wouldn't allow Caroline to wreck his home. Caroline returned in a few weeks, however, and John accompanied her back to the school in Christiansburg, leaving his wife behind. She wrote letters, but John was now under the thumbs of his aunts; Anna's health soon declined and she was placed in a sanitarium.

John's spirits also declined. On two occasions it was suspected that he attempted suicide—one when he fell off a train near Roanoke during a trip with Caroline. They insisted it was an accident, but the brakeman felt he had witnessed a suicide attempt. A few weeks later, John was pulled from an open cistern just in time to save his life. This time, Virginia Wardlaw raised the alarm and subsequently explained the accident—John had been taking measurements to provide a water supply for the school. A week later, Virginia again raised an alarm at eight o'clock in the morning. John was found thrashing about on the floor of his room at the college, his nightclothes on fire. Three hours later, he died of first-degree burns. The three sisters insisted it was an accident, not a suicide, and eventually received an insurance settlement in the amount of $12,000 (equivalent to $430,000 in 2025). It later emerged they had doused him with kerosene and burned him alive while he slept to collect the insurance.

While John's last months were playing out, Caroline traveled to Lynnville and insisted that Fletcher accompany her to Louisville concerning some family property. Vashti later learned that he had fallen very ill in Chattanooga, Tennessee. Vashti traveled to Chattanooga but was refused permission to see Fletcher by Caroline, who claimed that he was too ill. A week later, when Fletcher did not return as Caroline had promised, Vashti made a second trip to Chattanooga and discovered that Fletcher had been "moved from one boardinghouse to another by a woman answering to the description of Mrs. Martin". She returned home and, after a period of time, obtained a divorce. Fletcher then came to the college and married Ocey.

The three sisters entered into several fraudulent business deals in Christiansburg and the surrounding communities, eroding any trust the residents of that area had in them and sparking much speculation about their habits. Rumors spread in town that the sisters were engaged in secret rituals at Christiansburg's Sunset Cemetery, around the graves of their brother John and his wife Lizzie. Attendance at the school dropped, and chaos reigned in the classrooms. By 1904, the Montgomery Male Academy had closed, and male students were now also attending the Montgomery Female Academy, the name of which was now Montgomery Hall. Vandals wreaked extensive damage on the school and, by 1908, all three sisters, along with Fletcher and Ocey Snead, left Christiansburg for New York City and New Jersey.

== Treatment and death ==
For some unknown reason, after the death of their first child, and while Ocey was early in her pregnancy with their second, Fletcher Snead moved to Canada under an assumed name, and never contacted his wife again, but left her in the care of these women.

Ocey had apparently always been the object of scorn from her mother and aunts, who deliberately tried to starve her to death virtually from the day she was born. Subsequent to the departure of her husband, Ocey's health began to fail. Dr. William Pettit was called in to look at the sickly pregnant woman. He found her suffering from depression, "general weakness", and malnutrition. "She seemed depressed and indeed afraid of those about her," he told police later.

Pettit visited the Wardlaw household several times and repeatedly found that his instructions for Ocey's care were not being followed. Because the sisters were not cooperating, nor were they paying him, he stopped visiting. The sisters called another doctor, who smuggled food to Ocey when he saw her condition. Not long after Ocey's baby was born, he sneaked through a window to check on her, but Virginia threw him out. A lawyer subsequently told him there was nothing that could be done. Several months later, Pettit was once again summoned and found Ocey to be even weaker than before, and no longer pregnant. The baby, named David, had been taken to a hospital, where he was in poor health. He was later placed in an orphanage by the sisters; however, he died when just 9 months old and is buried next to his mother.

Virginia told Pettit to inform Ocey that she was dying and to tell her to make a will. Instead, Pettit had a nurse brought in to care for Ocey; the nurse stayed just one day before being removed by the sisters. Rather than pay the $100 bill presented by the doctor, the sisters offered to make him a $1,000 beneficiary in Ocey's will. He declined and decided to take steps against the family, believing that Ocey was "under some hypnotic influence." What he did not know was that Ocey was being given regular but unnecessary doses of morphine for her post-partum pain by her mother and aunts. When Pettit returned to check on Ocey before he reported the strange case to police, he found the place abandoned and the sisters gone.

The family next surfaced in another Brooklyn neighborhood in September 1909, when Virginia, wearing a thick layer of black veils, visited Julius Carabba, a New York attorney, and asked him to help a dying woman prepare a will. Carabba came to Ocey's bedside while her mother and aunts chanted prayers over her. After the prayers, Virginia asked Ocey if she wanted to make a new will, to which Ocey agreed. Carabba told the women that Ocey needed a doctor and some food. The sisters said they could afford neither. Carabba offered to write them a check and, while the sisters left the room in search of a pen, talked to Ocey. She told him that she was dying, reached under her pillow and gave him her will, in which she left everything to her grandmother and asked him to make himself executor. The sisters offered Carabba $7,000 (equivalent to $250,833 in 2025) to make them the beneficiaries. Carabba refused and the sisters dropped him as their attorney.

In October 1909, Virginia was served as defendant in a lawsuit for nonpayment of the price of a new piano. Her response to the plaintiff was "wait until we bury our dead." At this time, Ocey was near death from lack of food and medical care and was moved to an apartment at 89 East 14th Street, East Orange, New Jersey. There was no heat or gas for cooking and the place was furnished with just two cots, a rug, a chair, and a barrel for a table. The police were called by the family on November 29, 1909, and told there was an "accident". The police then sent a physician to their home. Virginia led Dr. Herbert M. Simmons, the Assistant County Physician, to an upstairs bathroom where Ocey's naked body was sitting in a tub of water with her head tilted under the faucet.

A suicide note pinned to her clothes was beside the bathtub. It read as follows:

Last year my little daughter died. Other near and dear kindred too have gone to Heaven. I long to go there too. I have been ill and weak a very long time now. Death will be a blessed relief to me in my sufferings. When you read this I will have committed suicide. My sorrow and pain in this world are greater than I can endure.

— Ocey W.M. Snead

Ocey was buried on December 7, 1909, at Mount Hope Cemetery, beside her father, 7-year-old brother, and 2-day-old infant daughter Mary Alberta, in Hastings-on-Hudson in Westchester County, New York. Her infant son, David Pollock Snead, who had been taken by the sisters shortly after birth and placed in an orphanage, died July 18, 1910, at the age of 9 months, and is buried with his family.

== Investigation and trial ==
Simmons deemed Virginia's answers to questions about Ocey's death suspicious, so he called the police to investigate. Ocey's death was identified as drowning, with starvation as a contributing cause. Suspicion for the death quickly focused on her family, particularly her mother and two aunts. The investigator who originally arrived at the home noted that it was cold and appeared unoccupied, and that the victim had been dead for at least 24 hours, prompting investigators to wonder why there was a delay in discovering the body. The evidence against the sisters consisted of several life insurance policies that had been taken out on the young woman, several suicide notes found in the possession of Ocey's mother that were written in the same hand and similar style as the note alleged to have been Ocey's suicide note, and the family's treatment of Ocey prior to her death. All three were arrested and charged with murder. Virginia Wardlaw starved herself to death in prison in 1910, while awaiting trial. Caroline Martin, late into her trial, finally pleaded guilty to manslaughter and was taken to jail, then transferred to an insane asylum, where she died in 1913. Mary Snead was released on a technicality, since there is no charge for accomplice to manslaughter and went to Colorado to live with her youngest son, Albert Charles Snead. They later moved to California, where she died in 1937.

== Suspects ==
- Fletcher Wardlaw Snead (1875–1955), Ocey's husband, was located under the name "John Lucas" cooking at the New Murray hotel in St. Catharines, Ontario, Canada and questioned. No incriminating evidence was found against him and he was never charged in connection with his wife's murder. He died in Los Angeles, California, on January 12, 1955, under his own name.
- Virginia Oceana Wardlaw (1852–1910), Ocey's unmarried maternal aunt, had attended Wellesley College and had never married. She taught at the Price School in Nashville, Tennessee, then, in 1892, became the head of the Soule Female College in Murfreesboro, Tennessee. Around, she moved to the Montgomery Female Academy in Christiansburg, Virginia. She died of self-induced starvation on August 12, 1910, while waiting for the trial to begin. Her body was sent to Christiansburg for burial in Sunset Cemetery.
- Caroline Belle Wardlaw Martin (1845–1913), Ocey's mother, had a career in education, at one point being removed from a position due to unstable behavior. She was considered to have been the instigator of her daughter's murder. She pleaded guilty to a lesser charge of manslaughter as part of a plea bargain. She was sentenced to seven years in prison and sent to the New Jersey State Prison in Trenton. She was declared mentally unstable on May 18, 1912, and then transferred to the New Jersey State Lunatic Asylum (Note: The institution was also referred to as the "State Hospital for the Insane" (a name also sometimes applied to its sister facility, Greystone Park Psychiatric Hospital, which was originally known as the New Jersey State Lunatic Asylum at Morristown).) in Trenton, where she died on June 20, 1913. Years later, evidence emerged that suggested she had poisoned her husband to collect on a $10,000 (equivalent to $387,000 in 2025) life insurance policy. She was also suspected of pushing her 7 year old son, Hugh Hodge Martin (1881–1888) down a flight of stairs, for which she collected on a $22,000 life insurance policy.
- Mary Elizabeth Long Wardlaw Snead (1849–1937), Ocey's maternal aunt and mother-in-law, was cleared of all charges on a technicality. Her oldest sister had pleaded guilty to manslaughter; Mary could not be charged as an accessory. She moved to her son's ranch in Colorado and was living with her son in California when she died October 1937.

== Other potential victims ==
- Hugh Martin (1881–1888), Ocey's brother. He may have been pushed down a flight of stairs and died a few days later.

== Archive ==
- University of Medicine & Dentistry of New Jersey Libraries, "Scrapbook of Photographic Evidence Regarding the Death of Ocey Snead," Harrison S. Martland, MD Papers
