= Glen Helzer =

American spree killer and cult leader (born 1970)

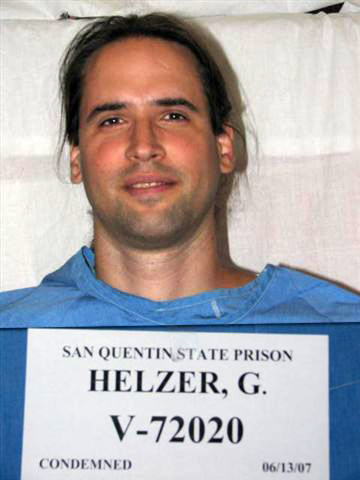
- Born: Glen Taylor Helzer; July 26, 1970 (age 56); Lansing, Michigan, U.S.
- Conviction: First degree murder with special circumstances (5 counts)
- Penalty: Death (March 11, 2005)

Details
- Victims: 5
- Span of crimes: July 30, 2000 – August 7, 2000
- Country: United States
- State: California
- Date apprehended: August 7, 2000
- Imprisoned at: San Quentin State Prison

Glen Taylor Helzer (born July 26, 1970), also known as Jordan Helzer, is an American self-declared prophet and spree killer who founded and led the Children of Thunder, a Mormon cult, until his arrest in 2000. Helzer and his followers murdered five people as part of an extortion plot intended to culminate with Helzer taking over the Church of Jesus Christ of Latter-day Saints (LDS Church) and hastening the return of Jesus; among their victims was Selina Bishop, daughter of blues guitarist Elvin Bishop.

== Early life ==
Glen Taylor Helzer was born in Lansing, Michigan, on July 26, 1970, to Gerry and Carma Helzer, both devout Mormons. He had a younger sister named Heather and a brother, Justin. A graduate of Ygnacio Valley High School, he served a two-year tour as a missionary for the Church of Jesus Christ of Latter-day Saints (LDS Church) in Brazil before serving in the Texas National Guard. He worked as a stock broker for Morgan Stanley Dean Witter until August 1998, when he went on disability after being diagnosed with bipolar disorder.

Helzer married his wife, Ann, in April 1993. They had two daughters before separating in June 1996.

== Children of Thunder ==
Helzer and his brother Justin met Dawn Godman on Memorial Day 1999 at a murder mystery dinner hosted by an LDS Church congregation in Walnut Creek, California. Justin and Godman became romantically involved and she moved into a house in Concord with the Helzer brothers the following April.

Helzer was excommunicated from the LDS Church in 1998 due to drug abuse. Around this time, he declared himself a prophet and developed a list of maxims he called “The Twelve Principles of Magic,” by which he expected his followers to abide. Helzer had plans to train Brazilian orphans to assassinate LDS Church leaders so that he could take over the church and start a self-help group called Transform America, which was intended to “create a state of peace and joy.” Helzer collectively referred to himself and his followers as the Children of Thunder.

== Murders ==
To finance his plans, Helzer developed a scheme to extort money from Ivan and Annette Stineman, an elderly couple in Concord who had been Helzer's clients when he was employed as a stockbroker. On July 30, 2000, the Helzer brothers and Godman kidnapped the Stinemans and forced them to write checks for $100,000 before murdering them.

Three days later, the trio murdered Helzer's girlfriend, Selina Bishop (who knew him as Jordan), in order to prevent her from potentially providing information that could lead to his arrest. To extort the Stinemans' money, Helzer convinced Bishop to open bank accounts in her name for his use; he told her that he was inheriting a large sum of money, which he needed to hide from his ex-wife. Helzer and Godman then went to Bishop's apartment, where her mother, Jennifer Villarin, was staying; Helzer decided to eliminate Villarin out of fear she could identify him. He murdered Villarin and her friend, James Gamble (who was incidentally at the apartment that night), using a gun registered to Justin.

== Arrest and trial ==
The five murders were connected when police recovered duffel bags from the Sacramento River Delta containing the dismembered remains of Bishop and the Stinemans. Investigators searched the Stineman residence and found a note by Ivan mentioning one Taylor Helzer. Friends of Bishop were shown a photo of Helzer, whom they identified as Jordan. A check with the California Department of Motor Vehicles revealed that he owned a 1998 Saturn sedan and Justin owned a white 1995 Nissan pickup, which matched descriptions of vehicles believed to be connected to the murders. Investigators also found that Justin had recently purchased a 9mm Beretta handgun, the weapon used to kill Villarin and Gamble. Fingerprints belonging to Justin and Godman were found in the Stinemans' van, which had been stolen and abandoned.

On August 7, 2000, police arrested Justin and Godman at their Concord home. Helzer fled to a nearby house, where he threatened a woman and demanded money, a gun and a car. He cut off his ponytail and then left through the back door; he was arrested shortly afterward.

Dawn Godman accepted a plea deal and agreed to testify against the Helzers; she was sentenced to twenty-five years to life in prison for the murders and twelve years and eight months for other charges related to the murders. Glen Helzer pleaded guilty to all charges and was sentenced to death. Justin Helzer pleaded not guilty by reason of insanity, with his attorneys claiming that he had a delusional disorder.

== Brother's incarceration and death ==
Justin was found guilty and sentenced to death; he was incarcerated at San Quentin Rehabilitation Center. He attempted suicide in 2010 by ramming pens into both his eyeballs. He survived but was left blinded and with brain damage. Justin committed suicide by hanging on April 14, 2013, while incarcerated.

== See also ==
- List of death row inmates in the United States

== Bibliography ==
- Scott, Robert (2005). Unholy Sacrifice. Pinnacle Books. ISBN 0-7860-1683-3.
