= Daniel LaPlante =

American convicted murderer (born 1970)

Daniel J. LaPlante (born May 15, 1970) is an American convicted murderer serving multiple life sentences for the 1987 murders of Priscilla Gustafson and her two children in Townsend, Massachusetts. Prior to this, he spent time in juvenile detention for a 1986 home invasion where he hid inside the walls of a family’s home in Pepperell, Massachusetts for over six months.

== Early life ==
LaPlante was born on May 15, 1970, in Townsend, Massachusetts. His parents divorced when he was young and his mother became a single parent. She later remarried and had two more sons.

While growing up in Townsend, LaPlante claimed to have been sexually and psychologically abused by many adults in his life including his father, stepfather and psychiatrist. Allegedly, LaPlante's father was responsible for the majority of the abuse.

LaPlante attended elementary school in Townsend and went on to attend St. Bernards High School in Fitchburg. LaPlante played football and ran track but he struggled with school. He was diagnosed with dyslexia at an early age. He also struggled with learning disabilities and attention deficit disorder.

Some of his classmates described him as "creepy" and "weird" and he was generally considered a loner by both fellow students and teachers. The opinion among the residents in the neighborhood was that LaPlante was "strange" and "disturbed".

As a teenager he was referred to a psychiatrist, who diagnosed him with hyperactivity disorder, because of his abnormal behavior, his appearance, and his lack of hygiene.

In October 1987, after the Bowen family invasion, LaPlante was living with his mother and stepfather while being out on bail. During this time he committed several burglaries in the neighbourhood where he obtained money and guns. Later, LaPlante's stepfather discovered one of these guns in LaPlante's laundry basket. When confronted by his mother and stepfather LaPlante claimed to have bought the gun. LaPlante would burglarize a neighboring family, the Gustafsons, where he would steal valuables and knickknacks.

== Pepperell home invasion ==
In 1986, LaPlante asked a 15-year-old Tina Bowen on a date over the phone. Bowen agreed, and when she met with him was shocked to see a rough and unkempt looking LaPlante, who had lied about his appearance to her. After their date concluded, LaPlante started to stalk Bowen regularly. Using his experience as a home burglar, LaPlante went inside the Bowen family home and hid in a very narrow space inside the walls of the house, which were said to be no more than a few inches wide.

After over a year of the Bowen family hearing strange noises and noticing household items going missing, Frank Bowen, Tina's father, opened one of his daughter's closets to find a dirty LaPlante with a face painted in ketchup and mayo with hair in spikes wielding Frank's hatchet and wrench. LaPlante then instructed Frank and his daughters to go into a bedroom before Frank slammed the door between him and LaPlante. Tina then jumped out of the second-story window and ran to a neighbor's house to call the police for help. When police arrived, they were able to extract Frank and his daughters out of the house and thoroughly searched the interior of the house, unable to find LaPlante.

Police later discovered a series of tunnels and small spaces inside the walls of the house, where LaPlante had been living. LaPlante was later found in the basement hiding in a corner behind a false wall. LaPlante had also been arrested by police other times previous for this.

== Murders and judicial process ==
On December 1, 1987, LaPlante entered the Townsend home of Priscilla Gustafson, a nursery school teacher. Gustafson, who was pregnant, was found face-down on her bed, her pillows covered in her blood. LaPlante noticed Gustafson and her 5-year-old son, William, coming home. She and William caught Daniel robbing the house. To avoid prosecution, LaPlante locked William into a closet and tied Gustafson to her bed. He then raped her and shot her twice at point-blank range. LaPlante heard William crying in the closet and took him out the closet, lured him into a bathroom, and drowned William to death in the bathtub. Gustafson's 7-year-old daughter, Abigail, saw LaPlante leaving the house, and LaPlante then lured Abigail into another bathroom and drowned her to death in the bathtub. Later that day, Gustafson's husband discovered the bodies and he called police.

LaPlante was questioned by police about two days after the murders but at the time there was not enough evidence to arrest him. Later the same day police went to LaPlante's home to interview him further and seeing the police approach, LaPlante leapt off the porch and fled. A manhunt was launched involving police, police dogs and helicopters. Meanwhile, LaPlante had made his way on foot to a home in the neighborhood where he stole a van and briefly took the woman who owned the van hostage. He then drove towards the town of Ayer where he was spotted and pulled over by a policeman. LaPlante left the vehicle and escaped into a lumberyard where he threatened the owner with a gun and then hid in a dumpster. LaPlante was then apprehended by two policemen who kept him under guard until reinforcement arrived at the scene, where LaPlante could be arrested and taken into custody.

A year later, LaPlante was sentenced to three life sentences for the murders of the Gustafsons. On March 22, 2017, a re-sentencing hearing for LaPlante was held at Middlesex Superior Court in Woburn, Massachusetts. LaPlante asked for a reduction in his sentence. At the hearing, it was mentioned that during his first appeal, previous court rulings were cited saying that juveniles convicted of murder should be given a meaningful opportunity to re-engage with society. There was also a new law allowing “juveniles convicted of murder with extreme cruelty and atrocity to ask for parole after they’ve been behind bars for a minimum of 30 years.” The judge, however, affirmed LaPlante's sentence of three consecutive terms of life imprisonment, with the possibility of parole after 45 years, after a forensic psychiatrist evaluated LaPlante and found that he was not remorseful for his crimes. LaPlante is currently held at MCI - Norfolk. Between 1990 and 2000, LaPlante was held in the custody of the Federal Bureau of Prisons, including at ADX Florence.

== Media coverage ==
LaPlante was featured in Season 2, Episode 1 of Investigation Discovery's Your Worst Nightmare series "Bump in the Night".

LaPlante was also featured in Season 1, Episode 2 of Lifetime Channel's Phrogging: Hider in My House series, "Footsteps in the Attic", which documented LaPlante's crimes committed prior to the Gustafson murders.

On September 9, 2024, Investigation Discovery released Season 1, Episode 1 of The Real Murders on Elm Street titled "Killer in the Walls."

On August 5, 2023, Lifetime released a film titled Boy in the Walls, also based on LaPlante's offenses prior to the Gustafson murders, where he secretly lived in the walls of a teenage girl's family house and terrorized the family through various methods before committing the Gustafson murders. Boy in the Walls is a fictional story only loosely based on LaPlante. The film is directed by Constance Zimmer and it stars Ryan Michelle Bathe and Jonathan Whitesell.
