= Alaina Urquhart =

American podcaster, writer and producer

Alaina Urquhart-White is an American podcaster, writer, and producer native to the greater Boston area of Massachusetts. She co-hosts the podcast Morbid: A True Crime Podcast with her niece, Ash Kelly. Urquhart released her debut novel, The Butcher and the Wren, in 2022. She did not attend college, but she was an autopsy technician by trade for 5 years before retiring to become a full-time author and mother of 3 children that she cherishes alongside her husband John.

== Career ==
=== Morbid ===
Ten years apart and raised as sisters, Urquhart and Kelley contemplated starting a podcast in 2015. They began production of the podcast ''Morbid'' in 2018. Urquhart incorporates her background in pathology into the podcast's discussions on forensic processes and decomposition. She began working as an autopsy technician in 2016, participating in research for a local pathologist.

The podcast is an anthology series that tells stories on true crime, ghosts, hauntings, and anything scary. They cover notorious killers, such as Jeffrey Dahmer, the BTK Killer, and Ted Bundy, but they also cover smaller and less reported cases. Urquhart in particular likes to cover cases from the 19th and 20th century: old unsolved cases that they can analyze and debate.

=== The ReWatcher ===
In 2022, Urquhart and Kelley released The Rewatcher: Buffy the Vampire Slayer, in which they recap and discuss the supernatural television series Buffy the Vampire Slayer. The podcast features Urquhart, a long-time viewer of the series, and Kelley, who is watching it for the first time. The pair release a weekly show that recaps every episode and Kelley guesses what will happen next.

=== Frozen Head ===
In 2023, Urquhart and Kelley released Frozen Head, which tells the story of the death of a 90-year old Laurence Pilgeram and how it is linked to Mike Darwin's peculiar quest to cheat death via cryonics. Darwin became one of the leading founders of the cryonics movement in the U. S. and was the president of the Alcor Life Extension Foundation, that freezes human heads until they can defrost them and attach them to younger and healthier bodies. Frozen Head examines the history of Darwin and Alcor, alongside the practices and motivations associated with cryonics.

=== Fiction writing ===
Alaina Urquhart released her debut thriller novel, The Butcher and the Wren, in September 2022, which was published internationally in more than twenty languages. Set in New Orleans, the book follows Dr. Wren Muller, a forensic pathologist who is being terrorized by a serial killer called the Bayou Butcher, known for hunting down and dismembering his victims.

On September 17, 2024, Alaina Urquhart released "The Butcher Game: A Dr. Wren Muller Novel" which hit number one in new releases on Amazon murder thriller novels.

Urquhart's fiction incorporates procedural details from her experience as an autopsy technician, including anatomical descriptions and forensic processes.

In 2022, New York Times bestsellerThe Butcher and the Wren was picked up to be set for a small screen adaption. It will be produced by Sister. Jennifer Yale will serve as showrunner, and it will be directed by Matt Bettinelli-Olpin, Tyler Gillett, and Chad Villella.

== Personal life ==
Urquhart lives in Boston with her husband, John White, and her three daughters. She gave birth to twin daughters in 2016, and another in 2019.

== Filmography ==
=== Podcasts ===
Year	Title	Role	Notes	Ref.
2018–present	Morbid: A True Crime Podcast	Producer, Co-Host	Hosted with Ash Kelley	
2022–present	The ReWatcher: Buffy the Vampire Slayer	Producer, Co-Host	Hosted with Ash Kelley	
2023	Frozen Head	Producer, Co-Host	Hosted with Ash Kelley	
