= Matthew Hoffman (murderer) =

American criminal (born 1980)

Matthew J. Hoffman
- Born: November 1, 1980 (age 46); Mount Vernon, Ohio, U.S.
- Convictions: Aggravated murder (3 counts); Kidnapping; Rape; Aggravated burglary Tampering with evidence Abuse of a corpse (3 counts)
- Penalty: Life imprisonment without parole

Details
- Victims: 3 murdered, 1 kidnapped and raped
- Country: United States
- State: Ohio
- Imprisoned at: Toledo Correctional Institution

Matthew J. Hoffman (born November 1, 1980) is an American convicted murderer known for killing three people (32-year-old Tina Herrmann, her 11-year-old son Kody Maynard, and her 41-year-old friend Stephanie Sprang), as well as kidnapping and raping Sarah Maynard, Herrmann's 13-year-old daughter, over the course of four days. The triple murders took place in Howard, Ohio. Police traced purchases for tarps found at the scene to a local Walmart that led them to Hoffman.

His case is featured in season 2, episode 5 of the show Deadly Sins, which is titled "Small Town Massacre", and in season 9, episode 4 of the show Signs of a Psychopath titled "It's Called Closure". Also, “The Basement: A Vanishing in Apple County”

== Murders and kidnapping ==
On November 10, 2010, Hoffman broke into Herrmann's house after camping in the woods the night before. Just as Hoffman was about to burglarize the home, Herrmann and Sprang entered the residence, surprising Hoffman.

After murdering Hermann, Sprang, and Kody Maynard, Hoffman took Sarah Maynard back to his house, bound and gagged her, and then left her in his basement. He then dismembered the three victims and stuffed them inside a 60-foot-tall hollow tree. The family was later reported missing, and a three-day search for the four ensued. Hoffman became a suspect when items uncovered in the house, a large tarp and large garbage bags, were found to be purchased from a local Walmart. The police reviewed video footage of Hoffman buying those items at that Walmart as well as leaving them in his own vehicle and were able to determine his identity through motor vehicle records. It also came out later that he had been stopped by police in the area where Herrmann's truck was found but had been released after being questioned as to why he was in that area. On November 14, detectives raided Hoffman's home and Hoffman was arrested. Sarah was rescued from his basement and survived, but had been forced to endure multiple days of rape.

== Trial and sentence ==
While incarcerated, Hoffman wrote a ten-page confession letter where he admitted to the murders and abduction, as well as revealing the location of the three bodies. While admitting to the abduction, Hoffman claimed he treated Sarah nicely and let her play video games, watch movies, and eat hamburgers. Hoffman's claim was contested by Sarah, with evidence of sexual assault. Hoffman was sentenced to life in prison without the possibility of parole.
