= And That's Why We Drink =

Comedy podcast

- ATWWD's Cover
- Genre: Comedy, True Crime, Paranormal
- Language: English

Cast and voices
- Hosted by: Christine Schiefer, Em Schulz.

Production
- Length: 50–120 min

Publication
- Original release: February 2017
- Provider: Kast Media
- Updates: Sundays

Reception
- Cited for: 2019 Best Comedy Podcast Webby Award, 2021 Best Comedy Podcast Webby Award

Related
- Website: andthatswhywedrink.com

And That's Why We Drink (ATWWD) is a comedy true crime and paranormal podcast created by Christine Schiefer and Em Schulz.

The show has been in production since February 2017. It updates every Sunday on a variety of podcast platforms as well as a YouTube channel where video recordings of the podcast's audio recording sessions have been uploaded since October 2019. Since its launch, the show has seen over eighty million downloads and has spawned two live tours through the United States and Canada.

In May 2019, and again in 2021, the podcast won People's Voice for Best Comedy Podcast at the 23rd and 25th Annual Webby Awards.

In March 2022, Schiefer and Schultz launched a second podcast, Rituals, produced by the Parcast podcasting network and streaming only on Spotify, which focuses on aspects of the occult, mystical and new age beliefs.

In late May 2022, Schiefer and Schulz published their first book, A Haunted Road Atlas, which debuted at #6 on the New York Times Best Sellers list for Advice, How-To and Miscellaneous works. A follow up, A Haunted Road Atlas: Next Stop, was released in September 2024.

== Format and production ==
The podcast is formatted into two sections. The first is the paranormal section, in which Schulz discusses a paranormal story, often dealing with suspected haunted locations, alien or UFO sightings, cryptids, and occasionally conspiracy theories or creepypastas. This is followed by Schiefer's true crime portion of the show in which she covers murders, serial killers, unsolved crimes, and abductions. The two friends, both Boston University graduates, often tell stories about their lives as well, occasionally adding personal anecdotes to the stories.

The original name of the show was "Eerie and Theory", but was changed later in the conception phase to "And That's Why We Drink", after it was jokingly exclaimed during a moment of exasperation.

Originally, the two hosts also divided themselves into "Team Wine" and "Team Milkshake," as Schiefer often imbibes alcoholic drinks during the recording sessions, while Schulz, a teetotaler, would drink a variety of milkshakes, and the two would list the reasons (both good and bad) they were drinking that episode. While this is still a way for the hosts to identify their respective fan bases (more recently including a Team Lemon), in later episodes of the show, the practice of drinking milkshakes was mostly abandoned.

On the first day of every month, the show features a special episode of "Listener Stories", in which the hosts read and react to stories of crimes and the paranormal submitted by fans, often with a theme requested by one of the hosts.

ATWWD occasionally features special guests, including the hosts' family and friends as well as comedian Lisa Lampanelli, who is Schiefer's aunt-in-law, and the podcast has done several crossover episodes with podcasts such as Wine and Crime, Morbid, and Sinisterhood, among others.

In October 2021, Schiefer took maternity leave after giving birth to her first child. During that time, Schulz continued to host the show along with a series of guest hosts, including Eva Gross and Schulz' girlfriend, Allison Goforth. Schiefer returned to the show in mid-February 2022. In September 2026, Schiefer announced she would be stepping down from hosting the podcast in October 2026, deciding to step back in order to focus more on her podcast network ParaPods which she co-founded with Schulz.

== Episodes ==
=== Regular show episodes ===
Regular show episodes
	Episode title	Paranormal topic	True Crime topic	Release date
1.	Frances Ford "Cupola" and the Off-Brand Kool-Aid	Winchester Mystery House	Jonestown Cult Suicide	9 February 2017
2.	Clothesline Cookies and the Lone Band-Aid	Whaley House	Robert Durst	15 February 2017
3.	Paranormal Bitchslaps and the Body Examiners	The Bell Witch	Black Dahlia	19 February 2017
4.	Demon Pigs and a Call from Tamara	Amityville Haunting	Sodder Children	26 February 2017
5.	The "Creepy Little Thing" and a Journey of Self-Destruction	Smurl Poltergeist	John Wayne Gacy	5 March 2017
6.	The Human Hair Version and the Worst Social Studies Class Ever	Robert the Doll	Elizabeth Smart Kidnapping	12 March 2017
7.	A Menorah Made of Lava and the Jerry Springer of Germany	Eastern State Penitentiary	Hinterkaifeck Massacre	19 March 2017
8.	Our First Fight and Franzia Stains... or Blood	Queen Mary Ship	Maura Murray Disappearance	26 March 2017
9.	The Wandering Cowboy and the Pregnancy Pact, but for Boys	The Sallie House	Michael Malloy	2 April 2017
10.	Annabelle the Doll-y Parton Impersonator and the Tap Water Scammer	Annabelle the Doll	H. H. Holmes	9 April 2017
11.	A Drunk Pandora's Box and How to Play the Elevator Game	The Dybbuk Box	Elisa Lam Death	16 April 2017
12.	The 300-Year-Old Drama Queen and the Bitchy 7th Grader	Busby's Stoop Chair	Carl Tanzler	23 April 2017
13.	The Cincinnati Mobsters and a PSA for Samsung	Bobby Mackey's Music World	Lisanne Froon and Kris Kremers	30 April 2017
14.	The Old School House of Pies and Freud's Field Day	Hotel Monte Vista	Josef Fritzl	7 May 2017
15.	A Sample of Our Outhouse and Catfished by Lucifer	St. Alban's Sanatorium	Gypsy Rose Blanchard	14 May 2017
16.	Horse Grunts and the 1900s Policeman Who Was Also a Scarf Person	Lemp Mansion	Papin Sisters	21 May 2017
17.	Flo & Frankenstein and Christine Has Another Stroke	Stanley Hotel	Katherine Mary Knight	28 May 2017
18.	An Even Worse Eyeball Story and the Adventures of Captain Midnight	LaLaurie Mansion	Craigslist Killer	4 June 2017
19.	A Great View of the DMV and There's No Such Thing as a Fun Best Friend Murder *	Hilltop House Hotel	Christine Paolilla	11 June 2017
20.	Fun Times in the Body Chute and Em's Hairy Torso	Waverly Hills Sanitorium	Gregory Scott Hale	18 June 2017
21.	Four Pounds of Uneaten Bacon and A Deeply Holy-Some Blonde	Villisca Axe Murders	Robert William Fisher	25 June 2017
22.	Vicious Vices and a "Shaved Off" Shotgun	Trans Allegheny Lunatic Asylum	Robert Reldan	2 July 2017
23.	A Demon Named Adelle and Oceans 11:06	Roland Doe	George Joseph Smith	9 July 2017
24.	A Ouija Board PSA and Lessons on Limes	Zozo	Xavier Dupont de Ligonnes	16 July 2017
25.	Ghostly Frenemies and Alcala-ism	White House Ghosts	Rodney Alcala	23 July 2017
26.	Homo-cidal Birdman and the Confessions of Shauna K.	Alcatraz	Mark Twitchell	30 July 2017
27.	Mr. Carbunkle and A Science Class Murder	Monte Cristo Homestead	Skylar Neese	6 August 2017
28.	Fannie and the Floppy Disk	Myrtles Plantation	Rebecca Schaeffer	13 August 2017
29.	Seasonally Employed Ghosts and the Scottish Tim McGraw	Jefferson Hotel	Peter Thomas Anthony Manuel	20 August 2017
30.	Slagpot Wormwood and Em's Nomadic Clown Life	Sloss Furnaces	Sylvia Likens	27 August 2017
31.	Pretty Woman Status and the Paranormal Pirate	Driskill Hotel	The Bloody Benders	3 September 2017
32.	Father Beelzebub and 4,000 Salutes	Anna Ecklund	Luka Magnotta	10 September 2017
33.	Coughin' on Coffins and #WereTheBride **	Rolling Hills Asylum	Paul Bernardo and Karla Homolka	17 September 2017
34.	A 200-lb Rat and the Dollar Store Plunger	San Pedro Haunting	Jack Unterweger	24 September 2017
35.	A Popcorn Fortune and a Friend Named Squirrel	Summerwind Mansion	Rampart Street Murder House	1 October 2017
36.	A German Socialist Airbnb and a Myspace Lesbian Porno	Franklin Castle	Bathtub Girls of Ontario	8 October 2017
37.	Kyle Columbus and The Napoleon Complex but with Cannibalism	St. Augustine Lighthouse	Issei Sagawa	14 October 2017
38.	An Alli-Ghost and the Gilded Eleventh Ballroom	Menger Hotel	John List	21 October 2017
39.	A Girl Named German and La La Land 1 1/2	Anneliese Michel	The Axeman of New Orleans	29 October 2017
40.	A Fashion-Forward Victorian Ghost and Workplace Triangulation	Crescent Hotel	Edmund Kemper	5 November 2017
41.	Dr. Carrot and the Score of Yore	Great Amherst Mystery	Herb Baumeister	12 November 2017
42.	The Eternal Bromance and Pretty Little Liars 3:16	Harvard Exit Theater	Ed Gein	19 November 2017
43.	A Hell-Roaring Camp and a Chick-en-Training	Bullock Hotel	Wineville Chicken Coop Murders	26 November 2017
44.	Turtle Tortoise and Frogger: IRL	Ashley's of Rockledge	Ursula and Sabina Eriksson	3 December 2017
45.	Excessive Murder and Miss Vatican	June and Jennifer Gibbons	Joyce McKinney	10 December 2017
46.	Cinnamontown (TM) and Pastor Detective	St. James Hotel	Pedro Lopez	17 December 2017
47.	A Boozy, Goat-Horned Menace and an Unwashed Cup	Krampus	Tamara Samsanova	24 December 2017
48	The Island of Misfit Priests and the Easter Egg Rapist	George Lukins	East Area Rapist	31 December 2017
49.	Bananas in Pajamas and Your Friendly Local Kioskman	Barney and Betty Hill	Lake Bodom murders	7 January 2018
50.	Luvs 'N Laffs and an Alt-Right Turn	Loftus Hall	Jamison Family	14 January 2018
51.	The One Where Ross Gets a Pager and a Moment of Silence for Google	South Shield Poltergeist	Ted Bundy	21 January 2018
52.	A Reverse Pickpocket and There Goes Melinda	Fairmont Banff Springs Hotel	Michael Alig	28 January 2018
53.	The Perm of the Century and A Call to the Apron Factory	Black Eyed Kids	Dolly Oesterrich	4 February 2018
54.	THE ANNIVERSARY EPISODE ***	Jack the Ripper	Past Life Experiences	11 February 2018
55.	Big (Frat) Brother and a Dixie Cup Stethoscope	Congress Plaza Hotel	Ward Weaver III	18 February 2018
56.	Hell's Carpet and McDonald's Airbnb	Enfield Haunting	McStay Family Murders	25 February 2018
57.	Harry Potter and the Chamber of Zombies and an Em-vis Impersonator	Russian Sleep Experiment	David and Louise Turpin	4 March 2018
58.	Wicca-How.com and the Return of RicePudding9 ****	The House of 200 Demons	Richardson Family Murder	11 March 2018
59.	The Spirit of AOL and Granola Silly Putto	Joshua Ward House	Slenderman Stabbings	18 March 2018
60.	A Brief History of the Indianapolis Urgent Care and A Distorted View of Ice Cream	Central Indiana State Hospital for the Insane	Yorkshire Ripper	25 March 2018
61.	A Human Lazy Susan and the Bloody Brunch	Squirrel Cage Jail	Leonarda Cianciulli	6 April 2018
62.	The Musical History Algebra Podcast and Emvis Returns	Morris-Jumel Mansion	Barbara and Patricia Grimes	8 April 2018
63.	A Good Old Canadian Gaol and the Summer of Like	Ottawa Jail	Robinson Family Murders	15 April 2018
64.	Father Bob and Wrong Answers	Borley Rectory	Locked Room Mysteries	22 April 2018
65.	A Gender-Neutral Wolf and Satan's Center Mouth	Dante's Inferno	Golden State Killer and Mandy Steingasser	29 April 2018
66.	Snowflake Forest and the Bacon Society	Travis Walton Abduction	Robert Pickton	5 May 2018
67.	The UK Office Alien and Too Much Mutton	Mothman	Lizzie Borden	13 May 2018
68.	A Lazy River Cellar and a Buffett Tattoo	Barnstable House	Brian Shaffer	20 May 2018
69.	The John Wick Effect and Funky Politics	Spontaneous Combustion	Wallace Souza	27 May 2018
70.	Fall Out Walt and a Child Called Murder	Doris Bither Poltergeist	Belle Gunness	3 June 2018
71.	Spicy Highways and the New Brazilian Evangelical Gay Church of Murderers	Yuma Territorial Prison	Suzane von Richtofen	10 June 2018
72.	A Bonanza of Coal and the Wrong Way to Impress a Girl	Black Star Canyon	Daniel Wozniak	17 June 2018
73.	Catholic Goosebumps and the Masked Blank	St. Louis Cathedral	Beast of Jersey	23 June 2018
74.	A Polite Shadowman and a Phony Film School	Pantages Theater	Clara Phillips	1 July 2018
75.	Pickled Bodies and the Grim Repo Woman	Payton Randolph House	Marlene Warren Murder	8 July 2018
76.	A Venn DiagRUM and Detective Constable Christine	Savannah Pirate House	Shannon Matthews Kidnapping	15 July 2018
77.	A Baptized Wonton and Spiral Notebook-ing	Children of Woolpit	Jennifer Pan	22 July 2018
78.	Paranormal Toontown and 40,001 Mystery Experiments	Skinwalker Ranch	Joseph Kallinger	29 July 2018
79.	A Demonic Cold Sore and the World's Smallest Violin	Peggy the Doll	Mary Vincent	4 August 2018
80.	Paranormal Justice and a Depressing High School Reunion	Rotherwood Mansion	Paula Herring	12 August 2018
81.	Little Pilgrims and Astrological Issues	Flannan Isles Lighthouse	Charles Cullen	19 August 2018
82.	Everyone's Ghostly Stepdad and a Tattoo of Frosted Tips	Lizzie Borden House	Amy Lynn Bradley Disappearance	26 August 2018
83.	Ghost Goats and Horror-scopes	Goatman's Bridge	Donald Henry Gaskins	2 September 2018
84.	A Powerful Chicken and a Techno Haunting	Aswang	Henry Lee Lucas	8 September 2018
85.	Transgender Lemonade and Old Ass Bowling Balls	Ed Gein's Cauldron and Bela Lugosi's Mirror	David Edward Maust	16 September 2018
86.	The Haunted Doll Market and 420 Zodiac	Harold the Doll	Zodiac Killer	23 September 2018
87.	Paranormal Fun Facts and Your Sister's Pony	Casper the Friendly Ghost	Jack Gilbert Graham	30 September 2018
88.	A Low Key Brothel and a Japanese Skater Boy	Cary Hotel	Setagaya Family Murders	7 October 2018
89.	Violent Tickling and a Hollywood Bonfire	Cecil Hotel	William Desmond Taylor	13 October 2018
90.	High Quality Excitement and a Serial Killer Crossover	Bloody Mary	Joel Rifkin	21 October 2018
91.	Mad Lib Disease and an Everlasting Faint	Scary Linda Stories	Ouija Board Murders	28 October 2018
92.	Twin Theybies and a Phone Call to the Mayor	La Llorona	Scary Renate Stories	4 November 2018
93.	The Broad of Broadcast and a Love Rhombus	Rose Hall Manor	Lauren Giddings	10 November 2018
94.	Cocoa Pebbles County and the Cannibal Cafe	Byberry Mental Hospital	Armin Meiwes	18 November 2018
95.	A Wendigo Named Megan and a Winnebago in the Woods	Wendigo	Hannah Graham and Morgan Harrington	25 November 2018
96.	A Garden in the Rear and a Rejection from ISIS	Octagon House	Selfie Killer (Amanda Taylor)	2 December 2018
97.	A Rogue Cork and The Millennium Special	Popper the Poltergeist	Katy Harris and Krystal Surles	9 December 2018
98.	Exorcism Colonics and a Hot Sauce Love Potion	Exorcist of the Vatican	Tina Watson	16 December 2018
99.	Paranormal Swirl and Aura Imprinting	The Ramms Inn of Gloucestershire	Yogurt Shop Murders of Austin, TX	22 December 2018
100.	Cryptids for 400 and a Best-Friend-Elope	Mary Celeste Ghost Ship	Andras Pandy	29 December 2018
101.	A Ghost in the Nude and a Pasta Peddler	General Wayne Inn	The Philly Poison Ring	6 January 2019
102.	Quantum Madness and an Abundance of Icicles	Time travel and Project Pegasus Part 1	Paul Michael Stephani	13 January 2019
103.	Martian Beer Pong and Sweat Glands of the Hand	Time travel Project Pegasus Part 2	Altemio Anchez	19 January 2019
104.	The Golden Girls Horror Crossover and a Cousin Cat	Borgvattnet Vicarage	Leslie Allen Williams	27 January 2019
105.	The Great Non-Binary Owl and Kronk's Evil Twin	Elizabeth Bathory	Medieval Falling Sickness	2 February 2019
106.	The Worst Toy Story and an Empty Wine Stockpile	Sleep Paralysis	John Frank Hickey	10 February 2019
107.	Ghostly Cat Toes and A Box-in-a-Box-in-a-Box	Jerome Grand Hotel	Wendi Andriano	17 February 2019
108.	The Kings of Banter and a Mummified Lemon	Dear David (story by Adam Ellis)	Viola Drath	24 February 2019
109.	A Tornado of Cuddles and an Extra Ab	The Beast of Gevaudan	Evelyn Dick	3 March 2019
110.	A Pretty Little Monster and a Planetary Enzyme	The Goatman of Maryland and The Pope Lick Monster	Ira Einhorn	10 March 2019
111.	A Ghost Tour by Em and a Mother of Pearl Pie Tin	Shanghai Tunnels	D. B. Cooper	16 March 2019
112.	The Age of Flurida and a Florida Man Floriscope	Fort Gary Hotel	Judy Buenoano	24 March 2019
113.	Millennial Pink and Spanish Moss Red Bug Crayons	Flagler College	Diane Downs	30 March 2019
114.	A Gnarly Rumor and Hysterical Historians	Pascagoula Abduction	John Christie	7 April 2019
115.	A Digital Butler and Walls Full of Secrets	Pfister Hotel	The Watcher House	14 April 2019
116.	The Pancake Witching Hour and the Ghost of Burritos Past	Ben Lomond Hotel	Lori Hacking	21 April 2019
117.	The Buddy system Til Death and Sprinkles of Light in the Chicago Suburbs	Spooky Food Stories	Tylenol Murders	28 April 2019
118.	A Demon in the Drain and Pentagrams on the Golf Course	Biltmore Estate	Dana Sue Gray	5 May 2019
119.	A Shadow Figure Selfie and Inappropriate Dream Journaling	Salem Ghosts	Jane Toppan	12 May 2019
120.	Burial Physics and the Troll of Jackass Hill	Gore Orphanage	Cleveland Torso Murders	19 May 2019
121.	The Plumbing Dutchman and a Murderous Glow Down	The Flying Dutchman	Jake Bird	26 May 2019
122.	Alien Bumper Cars and MTV Crypts	Navy UFO Reports	Susan Snow	2 June 2019
123.	The Ignoramus of Nevada and a Poisoned Prune Cake	Advanced Aerospace Threat Identification Program	Nannie Doss	9 June 2019
124.	A Birdless Penguin and The Wink Face Emoji	Tic-Tac Incident	Casey Anthony	16 June 2019
125.	A Neighborhood of Haunted Houses and Codename Vanilla Lunch	Yesteryear Village	Isdal Woman	23 June 2019
126.	Summer Camp at the Occult Vault and A Flintstone Motorcade	Edinburgh Vaults	Bryce Laspisa	30 June 2019
127.	Human Wine and the Postal Service Bank	Poveglia Island	Alyssa Bustamante	7 July 2019
128.	A Lasagna House and Scrapbooks of Destruction	The McRaven House	Michael Swango	14 July 2019
129.	A Tipsy Alien and Your Least Favorite Word	Flatwoods Monster	Shari Faye Smith and Debra May Helmick	21 July 2019
130.	A Creature's Femur and Giovani 3:16	Varginha UFAO	Kristen Costas	28 July 2019
131.	A Pretzel Worm and the 'That Was Easy' Button	Tatzelwurm	Tara Grant Murder	4 August 2019
132.	A Lost Bitch and the Weirdest Thing Said in an Interview	Eloise Asylum	Karina Holmer Murder	11 August 2019
133.	A Dumpy Tunnel and Dungeon Lite TM	Dover Castle	Max Gufler	18 August 2019
134.	A "Quicker Than You Look" Trophy and a Threddit RabbitHole	Haunted Toys-R-Us Locations	Kristen Modafferi Disappearance	25 August 2019
135.	The Ghost of Lamps Past and a Pumpkin Stealing Cryptid	Bridgewater Triangle	Mary Ashford and Barbara Forrest	1 September 2019
136.	A French Toast Ghost and the Pepper Spray Squad	Hillview Mannor	Kate Stoffel and the Biddle Brothers	7 September 2019
137.	Satan's Little Helper and the Year of the Microwave	Pukwudgie	Elizabeth Thomas Abduction	15 September 2019
138.	Five-Dollar Geodes and Our Neverending Awkward Phase *****]	Hodag	Edward Wayne Edwards	22 September 2019
139.	Lemon's Cousin and the Alien Frog Vendetta	Pier Fortunato Zanfretta	Stephen Peter Morin	29 September 2019
140.	Psychedelic Conversations and the Frogman's Lazy River	Loveland Frogman	Rotherham Shoe Rapist	6 October 2019
141.	Alligator Neck Looping and A Casual Last Minute Seance	Moon River Brewing Company	Sara Ambrusko Murder	13 October 2019
142.	The Buffalo Plaid Anniversary and a Sweaty, Sweaty Witch	Grace Sherwood, The Witch of Pungo	Bruce McArthur	20 October 2019
143.	Portal Ripping Muscles and Vampire Rumors	Ghosts of the Alamo	The Carter Brothers	27 October 2019
144.	A Baby with Teeth and Another Pillar of the Community	Pittock Mansion	Jeanne Ann Childs Murder	3 November 2019
145.	Octo-Puns and the Goose CamTM	Beattie Mansion	Helle Crafts	10 November 2019
146.	Iceberg Feet and Valuable Skittles	James Dean Death Car	Durham Family Murders	17 November 2019
147.	Catsgiving and a Sleeping Tuxedo	@gr3gory88 Twitter Feed	Lindbergh Kidnapping	24 November 2019
148.	Fro-Yo Fridays and 15,000 Slices of Dirty Meatloaf	Kay's Cross	Franklin Bradshaw Murder	30 November 2019
149.	An Unidentified Naked Object and the Girl Who Cried Jude Law	Ogopogo	Erika and Benjamin Sifrit	8 December 2019
150.	Soul Stealing Otters and a Detector Inspector	Kushtaka	Shannon Siders	15 December 2019
151.	The Penultimate Sisyphean Nightmare and Cursed Raisins	Kallikanzaros	Lawson Family Massacre	21 December 2019
152.	A Cute Bread and Breakfast and Emotional Grilled Cheese Sandwiches	Sauer Castle	Susan Cox Powell	29 December 2019
153.	An Ego Snack and a Lemon-napping	Hotel Galvez	Mary Morris Murders	5 January 2020
154.	An Opera About Bread and A Fake Monogrammed Private Jet for Dogs	Omni Parker Hotel	Christian Gerhartsreiter	12 January 2020
155.	A Teatime Seance and Lin-Manuel Miranda's Next Big Hit	Houdini Part 1	Tweed Morris Murders	19 January 2020
156.	The Chairman of the Haunted House Committee and Too Many Walters	Houdini Part 2	Sharon Kinne	26 January 2020
157.	A Hollywood Alien Correspondent and an Outer Space Lemon	The Akroyd Family	Kyle Fleischmann	2 February 2020
158.	A Vodka Blanket and Radioactive Snow Angels	Dyatlov Pass	Kevin Bacon Murder	9 February 2020
159.	A Sinister Vibe Check and the Governor of Noodletown	Ohio State Reformatory	Donald Harvey	15 February 2020
160.	Parry Hotter and a Choose Your Own Sad-venture	Minnesota Iceman	Dorothea Puente	23 February 2020
161.	Bald Anchovies and the Golden Birds	Thunderbird	Dorothy Jane Scott	1 March 2020
162.	A Gaga-Damn Delight and Sense of Crohdar	Mandela Effect	Corey Breininger	8 March 2020
163.	The Valedictorian of Space Camp and an Alien Princess	Poltergeist movie franchise	Jesse Pomeroy	15 March 2020
164.	A Cold-Toed Ghost and an Impromptu Ski Waxing	Langham Hotel	Sherri Rasmussen	22 March 2020
165.	Chaotic Riffing and Noodles All The Way To The Top	Hilary Porter	Anthonette Cayedito	29 March 2020
166.	Banjo-less Banjo Lessons and Toddlers Learning How to Podcast	Thornton Heath Poltergeist	Lindsay Buziak	5 April 2020
167.	The 69th Chakra and a Paranormal Insurance Family Plan Bundle	Mount Shasta	Heaven's Gate Cult	12 April 2020
168.	Lemuria Studios and a Tarantula Millionaire	Lemurians	Nancy Moyer	19 April 2020
169.	An Uncooked Goose and a B-Side Conspiracy	Omm Sety	Mitrice Richardson	26 April 2020
170.	A La Croix Lobotomy and a Big Golden Eye	Aradale Mental Hospital	Bain Family Murders	5 May 2020
171.	A Vegetarian Lake Monster and a Proud Consumptive	Pepie, the Lake Pepin Monster	Murder of Kitty Ging	10 May 2020
172.	The Paranormal Cinematic Universe and a Cosmopolitan Globetrotter	Harry Price Part 1	Lululemon Murder	17 May 2020
173.	Mongoose Cam and a New Gemini Icon	Harry Price Part 2	Smiley Face Killings	24 May 2020
174.	A Diamond in the Wall and Untarnished Vibes	Harry Price Part 3	Michelle Knotek	31 May 2020
175.	A Ruined Candy Crush Score and a Birthday Jimmy Buffett	Anonymous (group)	Murder of April Kauffman	14 June 2020
176.	A Cheesecake Business Meeting and a Pop Up Seance Nightclub	The Watseka Wonder	Kendrick Johnson	21 June 2020
177.	Gio's Burner Phone and a Very Slow Steamship Tour	Congelier House	Sherri Dally abduction	28 June 2020
178.	Christine's News Network and a Confused Conflagration	Cornelio Closa, The Invisible Boy	Murder of Dominique Fells	5 July 2020
179.	Gio's Quantum Point and How to Spell Meghan Backwards	Radonautica App	Murder of Rhia Milton	12 July 2020
180.	An Alien Silver Fox and Skeleton ASMR	Elizabeth Klarer	Jeffrey Dahmer	19 July 2020
181.	Upside Down Eyes and Tiny Doll Hand Shaped Bruises	The Island of the Dolls	Rey Rivera Murder	26 July 2020
182.	Meghan's Ghost Writer and a Glitter TikTok Box	Leap Castle	Kyron Horman	2 August 2020
183.	A Deeply Warped Tour and Random Dan	The Fire Spook of Caledonia Mills	Whitaker Family Murders	9 August 2020
184.	Cheesecake Drunk and Dog Fashion Swimming	Preston Castle	Angela Diaz	16 August 2020
185.	The Presence of Emothy and a Wine Glass Planchette	Chupacabra	Tamla Horsford	22 August 2020
186.	The Patron Saint of Podcasters and the Age of the Spinster	Poogan's Porch	Missy Bevers	30 August 2020
187.	Lydia Chlamydia and Father Macaroni	Eleonora Zugun	Laurie Bembenek	6 September 2020
188.	A Ouija Board Lemon and Poetized Martinis	Legend of Sleepy Hollow	Disappearance of Joshua Guimond	13 September 2020
189.	A Poultry Ghost and a Manasshole	SS Ourang Medan	Lorena Bobbitt	20 September 2020
190.	An After-Life Reality Show and a Hypnosis Session Spec Script	Nelly Butler, America's First Ghost	Keddie Cabin Murders	27 September 2020
191.	Modern Trash And The Pantsless Burrito	Mercy Lena Brown, The Last American Vampire	Juana Barraza	4 October 2020
192.	Comfy Chic and a Full Ass Exorcism	Snedeker Haunting	Bible John	11 October 2020
193.	An Afterlife Guard and a Rose Colored Flag	The Night Marchers of Hawaii	Israel Keyes	18 October 2020
194.	A Lisa Frank Ouja Board and Spider Egg Gum	Zak Bagans	Ronald O'Bryan	25 October 2020
195.	Frankenstein's Ding Dong and Haphazardly Fermented Kraut	Frankenstein	East Coast Rapist	1 November 2020
196.	Pop Icon Werewolves and Christine's Trash Can Cocktail	Werewolves Part 1	Cindy Song Disappearance	8 November 2020
197.	Satan's Sourdough Starter and a Fainting Couch	Werewolves Part 2	Neil Stonechild and the Saskatoon Starlight Tours	14 November 2020
198.	The Chef's Kiss of Death and Some Juice Covered News	Charleston Old City Jail	Watts family murders	21 November 2020
199.	The Surgeon Sturgeon Named Spurgeon and Big Bert in the Million Acre Wood	Loch Ness Monster	Joshua Maddux	29 November 2020
200.	The Burbank Fish-Flopper and a Homicidal Rhombus	Winchester Mystery House	Jonestown Cult Suicide	6 December 2020
201.	Pi Day Advent Season and a Ouija Planchette Flasher	The Fox Sisters	Phoebe Handsjuk	13 December 2020
202.	Spiritualist Chippendales and The Murder Situation Show	Davenport Brothers	Death of JonBenét Ramsey	20 December 2020
203.	The Abdominal Snowman and Christmas on an Embered Ash	Abominable Snowman	The Grinch	27 December 2020
204.	This Year's Sandwich Predictions and the Old Synaprague	Golem	Son of Sam	3 January 2021
205.	A Zero Gravity Wine Bra and a Coffee Date with Slenderman	The Simpsons Predictions	Miriam Rodriguez Martinez	10 January 2021
206.	A Vengeful Lady Fish and Biscuits with Bear	Pyramid Lake	Cleveland Kidnappings	17 January 2021
207.	The Return of the Plunger Fort and the Paranormal Gossip Mill	Cheltenham Ghost	Betsy Faria	24 January 2021
208.	Creepy Coats and a Party Lemon	Japan Airlines Flight 1628 Incident	Trang Ho	31 January 2021
209.	A Ghost's Recliner and the PTA of Covens	Bettis House	Sean Vincent Gillis	7 February 2021
210.	The Golden Plunger Award and the London Fog Cult	QAnon Part 1	Rajneesh Movement	14 February 2021
211.	The Echelon Twins and a Rotary Butt Dial	QAnon Part 2	Kitty Genovese	21 February 2021
212.	Conspiracy Theory Lasagna and the Migraine Episode	QAnon Part 3	The Snowtown Murders	28 February 2021
213.	A Trashy Bunny and the Podcast Built on a Thousand Demons	Arne Cheyenne Johnson	White House Farm Murders	7 March 2021
214.	Em's Sleep Skin and Christine's Day Skin	Headless Nun of New Brunswick	Savannah LaFontaine-Greywind	14 March 2021
215.	Bigfoot Geometry and Tin Can Fingerprints	Sasquatch	George Weyerhaeuser Kidnapping	21 March 2021
216.	The Opposite of a Meet Cute and a Half-Sister in Space	Laura Clarke Alien Abductions	Anthony Sowell	28 March 2021
217.	A Mantis Manifesto and a Serial Killer's Dentist	Mantis Alien	Richard Ramirez Part 1	4 April 2021
218.	A Skeleton's Waiting Room and Christine's New Screen Name	Bohemian Grove	Richard Ramirez Part 2	11 April 2021
219.	A Papier-Mache Nose Doll and Mothman's Grandchildren	Helen Duncan	The Somerton Man/Taman Shud Case	18 April 2021
220.	Astrophysics Improv and the Owl Queen	Back Door theory	Joe Exotic	25 April 2021
221.	Family Nuts and the Hitchhikers Guide to the Backrooms	Backrooms Theory	Abraham Shakespeare murder	2 May 2021
222.	The Wine Kill Switch and the Paranormal Vagina Monologues	Eva Carriere	Lin Family murders	9 May 2021
223.	Schiefesaurus and Balonatoons	The Kracken	Ted Kaczynski	16 May 2021
224.	The Hogwarts of Prisons and Two Generations of Cringeworthy Screen Names	Mansfield Reformatory	The Circleville Letter Writer	23 May 2021
225.	A Baby Barcalounger and the Water Tumbler of Doom	The Black Shuck	Harold Shipman	30 May 2021
226.	Poisonous Sharks and the Patchsquatch	America's Hircine Shifter	The Wichita Massacre	6 June 2021
227.	The Ghouls Next Door and the Criminal Pickle Barrell	Miss Molly's Hotel	Kayla Berg	13 June 2021
228.	Goat Cheese Marshmallows and Bougie Gators	St. Augustine Old Jail	Icebox Murders	20 June 2021
229.	Team Aliens and the Opposite of a Jolly Rancher	Westall UFO Sightings	Ronnie Long	27 June 2021
230.	A Cauldron of Mac and Chees and Sugar Free Gummy Bear Consumption	Agnes Sampson	Jayme Closs	4 July 2021
231.	A Royal Jalapeño Crib and The Worst Quilt Ever Quilted	The Brown Lady of Raynham Hall	Shanda Sharer	11 July 2021
232.	Paranormal Anxiety and a Seat in the Barking Room	Sorrel-Weed House	Charles Allen Jr. Disappearance	18 July 2021
233.	Cryptid Smut and a Boy Boss Summer	Dover Demon	The Colts Neck Mansion Murders	25 July 2021
234.	An Anxious Tooth Mouse and an Amateur Alligator Charmer	The Tooth Fairy	Lena Clarke	1 August 2021
235.	Space Cowboys and Semantics Champions	The Rozwell Incident	Terrence Williams and Felipe Santos	8 August 2021
236.	Ghostly Dog Breath and a Sardine and Sadness Sandwich	Pluckley Village	Magdalena Solis	15 August 2021
237.	The Ghost With No Pants and a Matchmaking Serial Killer	Falcon Lake Incident	Glennon Engleman	22 August 2021
238.	Bagelbites with Italian Seasoning and a Summer Camp Forensics Degree	Azzurrina	The Yoga Twins Murder	29 August 2021
239.	A Trash Pile of Ghostly Magazines and the Paranormal DARE Program	Ed & Lorraine Warren Part 1	Amanda Knox Part 1	5 September 2021
240.	A Haunted Hotline and a Vegan Doc Marten Sized Baby	Ed & Lorraine Warren Part 2	Amanda Knox Part 2	12 September 2021
241.	Time Travel Art and Cubed Wombat Poop	Rudolph Fentz	Ivan Milat aka The Backpack Murders	19 September 2021
242.	Ufo Potholes and Our Collective Eyebrow	Ariel School UFO Encounter	Laci and Scott Peterson Part 1	26 September 2021
243.	A Baker's Dozen No One Invited To The Party and A Bad Donut	Friday The 13th	Laci and Scott Peterson Part 2	3 October 2021
244.	A Demonic Cricut Cutter and Mercury's Mindflight	The Peabody-Whitehead Mansion	Michael and Suzan Carons aka The witch Killers	10 October 2021
245.	Napkin Hating Ghosts and An Immortal Portal	The Ringcroft Poltergeist	Moses Sithole	17 October 2021
246.	A Wall of Lava Lamps and Christine the Cackle Burger Witch	Hellfire Farm	Burger Chef Murders	24 October 2021
247.	Roach Milk and Em-Raphobia	Perron Family Haunting Part 1	Killer Clowns	31 October 2021
248.	Paranormal Preschool Gossip and June's Podcast Calendar Models	Perron Family Haunting Part 2	Joachim Kroll	7 November 2021
249.	The Devil's Timeshare and Sleepwalking Mouths	Elizabeth Knapp Haunting	Trick or Treat Murder	14 November 2021
250.	An Engineer of Good Times and Witches on Speed Dial	The Glenluce Devil	The Pillow Pyro	21 November 2021
251.	Mercury in the Microwave and a Ghost's Attic Speakeasy	The Glenn Tavern Inn Part 1	Susan Hamlin	28 November 2021
252.	B-List Ghosts and French Diamond Thief Girlboss Energy	The Glenn Tavern Inn Part 2 and the Philip experiment	Jeanne De Valois-Saint Remi	5 December 2021
253.	The Funcle Takeover and The Crime of Christine	Bunnyman Bridge Part 1	Jurgen Bartsch	12 December 2021
254.	The Bunnyman Bridge 5K and Pre-Halloween Santa Hats	Bunnyman Bridge Part 2	Bathsheba Spooner	19 December 2021
255.	Holiday Cryptid Friends and a Very Merry Christmas	Belsnickel	Santa Crimes	26 December 2021
256.	The Quest for Vegan Fried Chicken And Waffles and a Ghost's Nightcap	The Olde Pink House	Fritz Haarman	2 January 2022
257.	Xandy's Castle Roommate and Spicy Lighthouse Decor	Point Lookout Lighthouse	The Little Ross Lighthouse Murder	9 January 2022
258.	One Titty Out History and Eternal Skinny Dipping	Castle of Good Hope	The Old Charleston Jail and Lavinia Fisher	16 January 2022
259.	Ectoplasm Happy Hour and A Haunted Lawnmower	Ten Cent Beer Night	Pete the Poltergeist	23 January 2022
260.	Detective Spatula and Beard Forensics	Old Baraboo Inn	Teresita Basa	30 January 2022
261.	Supernatural Roaches and Ghost Potatoes	Curtis House Inn aka the 1754 House	Oscar Pistorius	6 February 2022
262.	The Quadratic Formula for Our Crushes and AIM Screen Name Numerology	Numerology	Disappearance of Patti Adkins	13 February 2022
263.	Best Friend TV Show Betrayal and the Era of Frappuccinos	Korner's Folly	Joyce Chiang	20 February 2022
264.	Our Newfound Noodles and Christine's Quantum Thoughts	Urban legend of stairs in the woods that lead to nowhere	Élan School Part 1	27 February 2022
265.	Generation Xiinön and Intergalactic Instant Messages	Fermi paradox	Élan School Part 2	6 March 2022
266.	Em's Condemned Troll Hole and a Ouija Related Genital Bridge	History of Ouija boards	Nikko Jenkins	13 March 2022
267.	Wooing Tactics and the Emothy Sunrise	Anansi's Goatman	Ramsay Scrivo	20 March 2022
268.	A Sea Shanty for Christine and Paranormal FaceTime	Stone Lion Inn	Angel Makers of Nagyrév	27 March 2022
269.	Cardiologically Speaking and a Magical Scarf Swoosh	Twin Bridges Orphanage	The Chess Board Killer Part 1	3 April 2022
270.	A Gold-Dipped Pickle and the Empurrress	The Palmer House	The Chess Board Killer Part 2	10 April 2022
271.	A Top-Heavy Brain and a Beer Can Easter	Barbro Karlén	Disappearance of Mekayla Bali	17 April 2022
272.	The Most Emo Cryptid and the Emcyclopedia	Squonk	Hybristophilia	24 April 2022
273.	The Jim Halpert of Ghosts and the People Pleasing Outlaw	Missouri State Penitentiary	Milton Sharp	1 May 2022
274.	Psychic Clouds and a Literal Goldmine	Stone tape theory	1976 Chowchilla kidnapping	8 May 2022
275.	The Thneed of Kentucky and the Stigmata of Squidward Tentacles	Glamis Castle	Teresita Basa	15 May 2022
276.	Christine Junior and Our Flatlined Sanity	Wyoming Frontier Prison	The Lego Murder	22 May 2022
277.	A Grass-Fed Cryptid and Trash Snacks	Fresno Nightcrawler	Mantell UFO Incident	29 May 2022
278.	A Birthday Demon and a Lunar Lemon	Alma Fielding/The Croyden Poltergeist	Cletus Hehmz	5 June 2022
279.	Burnt Microphones and the Hauntland	Becker 1971 televised exorcism Part 1	Richard Chase	12 June 2022
280.	Emothy Phantom and the Walt Disney of Ghosts	Becker 1971 televised exorcism Part 2	Bertha Gifford	19 June 2022
281.	A Gossip Corner Dinner Trap and Facts Served Up on a Celery Dish	Emlen Physick Estate	Springfield Three	26 June 2022
282.	A Sleep Zoo and a Big Gay Bathroom	Maringa Abduction aka AGRIPO Experiment	Belle Siddons aka Madame Vestal	3 July 2022
283.	A Psychic Wordle Turtle and a Tangent Lasagna	Mirassol Abductions	Oklahoma Girl Scout murders Part 1	10 July 2022
284.	The Troll Hole Emporium and the Time Traveling Wedgie Patrol	Tizzie Whizie	Oklahoma Girl Scout murders Part 2	17 July 2022
285.	An Emergency Bag Escape Room and a Pantsless Recording	Afanc and the Lavellan	Lisa McVey	24 July 2022
286.	A Middle Finger Lemon Manicure and the Devil's Night-Time Corn Walk	Devil's Tramping Ground (North Carolina)	Nicholas Barclay	31 July 2022
287.	The Gay Bathroom Invite Revisited and a Selection of Mothman Mugs	Tarrare	Texarkana Moonlight Murders	7 August 2022
288.	A Podcast Done via Ouija Board and a Bewitched Cow	Trial of Mary Webster (Witch of Hadley)	Van Breda Family Murder	14 August 2022
289.	Jewish Deli Chocolate Milk and Microsoft PowerPoint Dissolve Ghosts	Spring-heeled Jack	Lake Oconee murders	21 August 2022
	Special Episode: 2nd Annual Cryptids Unscripted Poetry Slam and Charity Auction			21 August 2022
290.	Psychic Surgery Dreams and Christine's Principle's of Magic	Moundsville Penitentiary	Children of Thunder Part 1	28 August 2022
291.	Router Hauntings and Our Weekly World News Broadcasting Voices	Batsquatch	Children of Thunder Part 2	4 September 2022
292.	Hellhound Belly Rubs and Caveman Ghost Tchotchkes	U.S. Route 66	Angela Hammond	11 September 2022
293.	A Hottie Without a Body and the Fun Factory	Enfield Monster	Alferd Packer	18 September 2022
294.	Strawberry Eyeballs and Our Wildest Autumnal Dreams	Crosswick Snake/Monster	The Scarlet Letter murder	25 September 2022
295.	A Yak Attack and a Kidnapper's SoundCloud	Ghosts of Port Townsend	Abduction of Denise Huskins	2 October 2022
296.	A Lemon Planchette Read-a-Long Graphic and a Material Girl Coffin	Manresa Castle	Alexander family and the Lorber Cult	9 October 2022
297.	A Halloween Holiday Gift and Justice for Book	Selkie	Abduction of Shawn Hornbeck	16 October 2022
298.	A Merch Bag of Dirt and the Latest Sensation for Jaded Lovers of Uncanny Things	Haunted coal mines	Pamela Smart	23 October 2022
299.	A Lesson in Filaments and a Future Ghost Prank	Hotel del Coronado	Jane Marie Prichard	30 October 2022
300.	Bougie Ghost Hunting and Wafts of Fog Friends	Winchester Mystery House, in person	Listener stories, paranormal equipment, EVPs	6 November 2022
301.	Jack-o-lantern Moths and Spooky Smiles	History of Halloween traditions	Susan Kuhnhausen	13 November 2022
302.	An Elbow Eyebrow and an Asparagus Salad	Berry Pomeroy Castle	Stacey Castor	20 November 2022
303.	A Pumpkin Head and a Biased Bisexual	Disappearance of Frederick Valentich	Murder of Mandy Stavik	27 November 2022
304.	Hand Paws and Wisconsinners	Beast of Bray Road	Athalia Ponsell Lindsley	4 December 2022
305.	An Onion of a Drink and a Real Life Fish Flop	Greenbrier Ghost	Stalking of Laura Black	11 December 2022
306.	Mailed Stale French Fries and Rogue Eyebrows	Greyfriars Kirkyard	Napa Valley Halloween Murders	18 December 2022
307.	Secret Krampus and Creepy Cake	Perchta, Mari Lwyd, and Hans Trapp	Murders of Ed and Minnie Maurin	25 December 2022
308.	Trenchfoot Animation and Ballhootin' Through the Holler	Dullahan	Murders along the Appalachian trail	1 January 2023
309.	A Haunted Doll Book Club and a Murder Comic	Terrell Copeland UFO sightings	Cordelia Botkin	8 January 2023
310.	The Town Shrieker and the Grape Escape	Banshee	Case that Stockholm Syndrome originated from Part 1	15 January 2023
311.	Vaudeville Canes and Hand-Clap Games	Tower of London	Case that Stockholm Syndrome originated from Part 2	22 January 2023
312.	Our AIM Renaissance and Our Cryptid Festival Year	Van Meter Visitor	Connecticut River Valley Killer	29 January 2023
313.	Tommy Pickles Voice and Milkshake Throat	Haunted dorm rooms	Murder of Carole Garton	5 February 2023
314.	Haircuts for Haunted Dolls and Christine's October Elf on the Shelf	Six haunted dolls	Christa Pike	12 February 2023
315.	A Compendium on the Birds of Kentucky and a Celebrity Opossum	Torsåker witch trials of Sweden	Murder of Connie Dabate	19 February 2023
316.	Em's Apothecary and a Tincture of Frenzy	The Seven Deadly Sins	Alice and Gerald Uden	26 February 2023
317.	An Emergency Snuggie and a Vitaminute	Tallman House in Horicon, Wisconsin	Abduction of Katie Poirier	5 March 2023
318.	Collateral Damage to Everyone's Misdeeds and Thor Peanut Butter Schiefer Schultz	Crossroads	Murder of Molly Watson	13 March 2023
319.	Synchronicity Sandwiches and Long Lost Mustard Friends	Liminal spaces, Hecate	Murder of Janet Abaroa	19 March 2023
320.	A Lucid Dreaming Banana Experience and the Famous Saint Jack-in-the-Box Ley Line	Ley lines	Disappearance of Lauren Spierer	26 March 2023
321.	A Coffee Unboxing and a Boiling Milk Cocktail	Mollie Fancher aka the Brooklyn Enigma aka the Fasting Girl	Khalil Wheeler-Weaver Part 1	2 April 2023
322.	The Halloween House and the Woolper News	Mammoth Cave in Kentucky	Khalil Wheeler-Weaver Part 2	9 April 2023
323.	Em's Galactic Bartending and Christine's Grog Shoppe	The Scottish play	Burke and Hare	16 April 2023
324.	Foot Pimples and Chicken Pox Parties	Stigmatized property law aka the Ghostbuster Ruling	Kathleen Peterson aka the Staircase Murder	23 April 2023
325.	Last Minute Lasik and Nonsense for Your Mind	The Union Screaming House in Missouri	Jared Fogle	30 April 2023
326.	Step-Stud Muffins and Microphone Kisses	Abductions in the story of Brian Scott	Murder of Angie Dodge	7 May 2023
327.	Consensual Foot Blister Pics and the Speaking Your Mind Dance	Moffitt Family haunting	Lewis–Clark Valley murders	14 May 2023
328.	A Wicked Birthday Card and a Vampirarchy	Highgate Vampire	Murder of Ellen Sherman	21 May 2023
329.	Sad Happy Hour and Night Nuts	Doppelgänger	Red Barn Murder	28 May 2023
330.	Psychic Grandma and Swimming in Jeans	Kinsella twins UFO encounters	Duggar family	4 June 2023
331.	A Milky Way Martini and a Naughty Gaudy Party	Ghost stories of the University of Toronto	The Porco family murders	11 June 2023
332.	The Mysterious Bisexual and the Sauce of Time	Time traveler Sergei Ponomarenko	Murder of Nona Dirksmeyer	18 June 2023
333.	Glowing Green Spaghetti Bolognese and a Teeny Tiny Apothecary	David Grusch UFO whistleblower claims	Case of Ryan Waller	25 June 2023
334.	Macarena of Veins and Casper's Foil	Hotel Alex Johnson	Murder of Grace Millane	2 July 2023
335.	The Gospel of Chillax and a Plot Tornado	Sister Magdalena of the Cross	Lady of the Dunes	9 July 2023
336.	An Armoire of Brandy Snifters and Mug Madness	UFO encounter of Snippy the horse	Hall–Mills murder case	16 July 2023
337.	An Empire of Ems and a Sitcom about a Wizard's Origin Story	Dudleytown, Connecticut	eBay stalking scandal	23 July 2023
338.	Caramel Apple Eating Ghosts and Moist Brains	Franz Mesmer	Malaysian Airlines Flight 370	30 July 2023
339.	A Time Capsule Era and a Weasel Break-In	2012 doomsday prophecy	Viktoria Nasyrova	6 August 2023
340.	Midnight Moon Bounces and Moody Away Messages	The Demon of Brownsville Road	Kelly Cochran	13 August 2023
341.	Conversations with Fake Allison and Cast Iron Skeletons	Shaker's Cigar Bar in Milwaukee	Sherri Papini kidnapping hoax	20 August 2023
342.	A Soft Launched Haunting and a Paranormal Rat King	Madison Seminary	Lori Arnold AKA the Queen of Meth	27 August 2023
343.	Cute Mishaps and Emoticon Etiquette	Ghosts of Yosemite National Park	Costa Concordia disaster	3 September 2023
344.	A Neon Parrot Beacon and a Hootenanny of Birds with Pigtails	La Lechuza aka the witch owl	Malcolm MacArthur	10 September 2023
345.	Baba Yaga Barbie and Emergency Needlepoint	Baba Yaga	Lost Boys of Bucks County	17 September 2023
346.	A Witch's Rap Battle and a Cursed Fart	John Darrell	Lucie Blackman	24 September 2023
347.	A Lovely Villain Era and a Lasagna Horror	Hauntings of Lake Lanier	Billy the Kid	1 October 2023
348.	Stolen Meditation Journals and Fun, Fruity Pond Water	The Catskills Crone	Barnes Mystery aka the murder of Julia Martha Thomas	8 October 2023
	3rd Annual Cryptids Unscripted Poetry Slam			13 October 2023
349.	A Haunted Podcast Studio and a Space Boat	Project Blue Book	Disappearance of Susan Wolff	15 October 2023
350.	Eyelid Licking Demons and Black Cat Broomsticks	Black cat lore	Heather Mayer	22 October 2023
351.	Mongoose Sound-Waves and Halloween Caroling	Seven princes of Hell	Halloween pranks and crimes	29 October 2023
	BONUS EPISODE: A Halloween Surprise with Roz Hernandez!			31 October 2023
352.	A Vampire Castle Gift Shop and Millennial Secret Passageway Dreams	Vlad the Impaler and the hauntings of Bran Castle	Murder of Martha Moxley	5 November 2023
353.	A Weird Date Agent and a Ghost Go Bag	Black Monk of Pontefract	The George Brothers	12 November 2023
354.	A Tarot Therapy Session and a Ghost Cat Pawty	Old Idaho State Penitentiary	Disappearance of Kimberly Avila	19 November 2023
355.	Ghouls, Gays, Theys and Cottage Core Lesbian Hauntings	Alton Towers	The Amityville Horror House	26 November 2023
356.	Spam Artists and Interplanetary Gossip	Superstitions on mirrors	Case of Darlie Routier	3 December 2023
357.	A Millennial Pause and a Scythe Tsunami	Psychopomps	Disappearance of Steven Kuback	10 December 2023
358.	The Frenaissance and the Poopmonger	Mary King's Close	Dennis Rader - BTK Part 1	17 December 2023
359.	Secret Society Bullshit and Paranormal Rejection at the Front Desk	The Augustine Steward House	Dennis Rader - BTK Part 2	24 December 2023G
360.	A Vampiric Stage Lipstick and a Nap Episode	Third man factor Syndrome	Murders of Dean and Tina Clouse	31 December 2023
361.	Troll Hole To-Go and Naming Our ADHD	Possession of Clarita Villanueva	Murder of Brenda Powell	7 January 2024
362.	An Identi-Tea Crisis and Wobbly Mountain	The Bennington Triangle	Harvey Glatman AKA the Glamour Girl Slayer	14 January 2024
363.	A Failed Handstand and an Infestation of Prairie Dogs	Cheesman Park	The Spider Man of Denver	21 January 2024
364.	A Boulder of Salt and a Shot Put of Horseradish	Acid Bridge and the 7 Gates of Hell	The Death of Natalie Wood	28 January 2024
365.	Podcasting in Dog Years and Collecting Crows Feet	The Nodolf Incident	The Lipstick Killer Part 1	4 February 2024
366.	Troll Butter and Moon Spit	Kentucky Meat Shower	The Lipstick Killer Part 2	11 February 2024
367.	Millennial Road Signs and Yappucinos	Baba Vanga Prophecies	Case of Natalia Grace	18 February 2024
368.	Whodunnit Hauntings and Three Lollipops in a Trench Coat	Haunting of Isabell Binnington	Murder of Sharron Prior	25 February 2024
369.	Frankenstein's Monster's Ghost and Grunge Justice	The Dakota Apartments	Murder of Mia Zapata	3 March 2024
370.	Therapy Book Club and Satan's Church Fonts	Rougarou	Malcolm Naden	10 March 2024
371.	Warnings About File Organizing and Smooth Coffee Shop Compliments	Twin Flames Universe Cult	Holly K. Dunn	17 March 2024
372.	A Trash Nap and a Clumsy Girl Ghost	King's Tavern	Murder of Seath Jackson	24 March 2024
373.	The Thirsty Little Rat Inn and the Coowoo Girls	Longfellow's Wayside Inn	Anthony Broadwater and Alice Sebold	31 March 2024
374.	A Big Queer Door and The Mulberry Bush of the Year	Dark side of nursery rhymes	Krystian Bala	7 April 2024
375.	Joann's Haberdashery and Ghost Logic	The Merchant's House Museum	Ruby Franke/8 Passengers Part 1	14 April 2024
376.	Vintage Honks and Zoomies Screams	The Char Man of the Ojai Valley	Ruby Franke/8 Passengers Part 2	21 April 2024
377.	Carnival Cobblers and Time Travelling Text Messages	The Pollock Twins aka The Hexham Rebirth	Terry Rasmussen aka The Chameleon Killer	28 April 2024
378.	The Butter Bar Lore and the Glass Peacock Yappers	Capitol Theatre Building (Flint, Michigan)	Murder of Cari Farver	5 May 2024
379.	A Never-ending Slumber Party and an ATWWD Bowling League (Live Show at Houston Improv, 2019)	The Spaghetti Warehouse (Haunted) and The Old Spaghetti Factory	Ana Trujillo aka The Stiletto Killer	12 May 2024
380.	The Spookyeasy and the Crime Travelers, Partners in Time	The Hannah House	Disappearance of the Klein Brothers	19 May 2024
381.	Drunk on Leaves and Resurrecting the Information SuperHighway	The Mongolian Death Worm	Murder of Greg Fleniken aka The Body in Room 348	26 May 2024
382.	Birthday Bummers and Haunted Emo Cowboys	The O.K. Corral and Boothill Cemetery	Murders of Kylen Schulte and Crystal Turner	2 June 2024
383.	Pseudo Armchair Ear Experts and Flower Pot London Fogs	Ogden Union Station	Murder of Travis Alexander by Jodi Arias	9 June 2024
384.	A Raccoon Bagel Infestation and a Birthday Shot in the Butt	Elias Henry Jones and Cedric Waters Hill	Inna Budnytska	16 June 2024
385.	Dinosaur Spiritualism and Mediumship Advisors	Mediums of the Lily Dale Spiritualist Assembly	Nicholas Alahverdian	23 June 2024
386.	A Telegram to our Exes and a Hell of a Case of Swamp Gas	The Allagash Four	Disappearance of Blanche Monnier	30 June 2024
387.	Adulting Cheat Codes and Dramatic Readings of the Cha Cha Slide	The Old Licking County Jail	The Claypool Hotel	7 July 2024
388.	Stress Rashes and Deranged Camera Angles	The Cock Lane Haunting	Suzanne Sevakis Part 1	14 July 2024
389.	Intriguing Event Schedules and Lukewarm Cans of Sparkling Water	The Gilcrease House	Suzanne Sevakis Part 2	21 July 2024
390.	A Noodle Room and a Doodle Competition	Sturdivant Hall	Wrongful Conviction of Juan Catalan and Murder of Martha Puebla	28 July 2024
391.	A Penultimate Show and a Bonus Drinking Game Round (Live Show in Albany, 2019)	Fort William Henry at Lake George	Murder of Peter Porco	4 August 2024
392.	Rat Girl Summer and Weepy Hollow	Buffalo Bill's Irma Hotel	Disappearance of Heather Teague	11 August 2024
393.	A Feral Rat Summer and A Trench Coat Full of Snakes	Stepp Cemetery	Sally McNeil	18 August 2024
394.	A Glitching Sim and a Yappy Hour	Black Hope Cemetery	Murders of Julie Williams and Lollie Winans	25 August 2024
395.	Dessert Waters and Gullah, Gullah Island Medical Degrees	Exorcism of Gottliebin Dittus	Murder of Molly Bish	1 September 2024
396.	A Curtain Fiesta and a Ghost's Fan Mail	Red Onion Saloon	Steven Stayner (Part 1)	8 September 2024
397.	A Poultrygeist and an En-gay-gement	The Highgate Hill Chicken	Steven Stayner (Part 2)	15 September 2024
398.	A Pink Panther Ghost and The Great Disappointment	Tomb of Colonel Jonathan Buck	Branch Davidians and the Siege of Mount Carmel	22 September 2024
399.	Em’s Day O' Fun and a Ghost Renovator	Sylvester K. Pierce House	Case update from episode 15 on Gypsy-Rose Blanchard	29 September 2024
400.	Dry Spaghetti Psychics and Gay Gasps	Dancing plague of 1518	Alice Mitchell and her murder of Freda Ward	6 October 2024
401.	Demon Water Superpowers and a Pretty Poisoner	Possession of Don Decker	Audrey Marie Hilley	13 October 2024
402.	Psoriasis's and Amazon Prime Skydiving	Jemima Packington	Victoria Cilliers (Part 1)	20 October 2024
403.	Senior Citizen Energy and a Love Rhombus	Cell Block Nightclub	Peter Fabiano	27 October 2024
	Special Episode: 4th Annual Cryptids Unscripted Poetry Slam			31 October 2024
404.	A Spider Problem and a Grumpy Toad	Old Faithful Inn	Victoria Cilliers (Part 2)	3 November 2024
405.	Halloween Hangovers and Top Tier Candy Handers	The Monster of Dildo Pond	Kidnapping of Jacob Wetterling	10 November 2024
406.	A Nap Seance and The Christine Claw	Griggs Mansion	Kidnapping of Jaycee Lee Dugard (Part 1)	17 November 2024
407.	A Seance Arsonist and Ghosts with Gall	The Cahill Mansion	Kidnapping of Jaycee Lee Dugard (Part 2)	24 November 2024
408.	A Charles of All Trades and ADHD Funeral Plans	The Hampton House	Murder of Sarah Stern	1 December 2024
409.	A Traumatic Tern Statue and a Fainting Couch for Two	The Sword Gate House	Murder of Erik Poltorak	8 December 2024
410.	The Loose Moose Trio and Mr. I Need a Ride	The Adobe Deli	Murder of Mike Barajas	15 December 2024
411.	A Chef Boyardee Vape Situation and a Sheepless Shephard	Hans Trapp	Murder of Michelle Martinko	22 December 2024
412.	Leona's Ghost and High Definition Palm Sweat	The Knowles Family UFO Incident	Murder of Polly Klaas	29 December 2024
413.	The Corpse Color Zoom Filter and the Fun Little Treat Lifestyle	The Lizard Man of Scape Ore Swamp	Joanna Dennehy	5 January 2025
414.	Flying Foopengerkles and The Art of Yapping	Sinkhole Sam, AKA the Kansas Cyptid	Alison Botha	12 January 2025
415.	A Kiss of Silence and a Ghost Who Hates Mansplainers	The May-Stringer House	Tracie Andrews and her murder of Lee Harvey	19 January 2025
416.	Em's Reocurring Bit and A Gossipy Tale	The Denver Airport Conspiracies	Murder of Bob Samuels	26 January 2025
417.	Breaking into Wallace and Giving Balloons to Priests	The Possession of Gina	Disappearance of Brianna Maitland	2 February 2025
418.	A Labrador Retriever's Decorating Sensibilities and a Barbed Wire Knitting Circle	The Guyra Ghost	Murder of Patsy Wright	9 February 2025
419.	The Salty Spitoon Sauna and the Bookworm Protocol	The Humpty Doo Poltergeist (Part 1)	Murder of Helene Pruszynski	16 February 2025
420.	Demons with Tongs and the Big Loft in the Sky	The Humpty Doo Poltergeist (Part 2)	Murder of Frank McAlister	23 February 2025
421.	Frenemies in Relaxing and a Mid Nap Yap	The Cage of St Osyth (Part 1)	Murder of Billie-Jo Jenkins (Part 1)	2 March 2025
422.	Nostalgic 90's Tarot Cards and a Block Party of Ghosts	The Cage of St Osyth (Part 2)	Alicia Kozakiewicz	9 March 2025
423.	Baby Cobra Podcasting and a Goblin Grandfather	The Exorcisms of Nicola Aubry, AKA The Miracle of Laon (Part 1)	Disappearance of DeOrr Kunz Jr.	16 March 2025
424.	Mount Shasta Synchronicities and Beelzebubbe's Little Matzo Ball	The Exorcisms of Nicola Aubry, AKA The Miracle of Laon (Part 2)	Murder of Billie-Jo Jenkins (Part 2)	23 March 2025
425.	Our Pancake Era and Cosmic Sleep Mysteries	The Exorcisms of Nicola Aubry, AKA The Miracle of Laon (Part 3)	Aaron Goodwin murder plot	30 March 2025
426.	A Big Bi Cup and Christine's Box of Doom	Burlington County Prison	Kidnapping of Hannah Anderson	6 April 2025
427.	Chiropractic Adjustments for the Soul and Could-Be-Me Shadow Men	The Farrar Schoolhouse	Murder of Amber Hagerman	13 April 2025
428.	A Smuggled Cream Soda and a Vibin' Lady in White	Hotel Metlen	Murders of Andrew Bagby and Zachary Turner	20 April 2025
429.	A Personal Pug Nightmare and a Driving School Lore	Hotel Macomber	The Las Cruces Bowling Massacre	27 April 2025
430.	Opening Night Haunts and Scamaroonies (Live Show in Brooklyn, 2019)	The Ghosts of Broadway	George C. Parker	4 May 2025
431.	Mr. Glitter Shoes and a Mystery Vortex	The Green Ribbon	Murder of Chynelle Lockwood	11 May 2025
432.	A Techno Western Hotel and a Moonlit Bobcat Crime	Hotel Congress	Murder of Aliza Sherman	18 May 2025
433.	Tee Shirt Abs and Moving Fonts (Live Show in Tampa, 2019)	The Cuban Club & Don Vicente de Ybor Historic Inn	'Florida Man' crime stories	25 May 2025
434.	A Haunted Pamphlet Collection and the Invention of Forensic Husbandry	The Mowing Devil, AKA Strange News out of Hartford-shire	Murders of Allison Jackson-Foy & Angela Nobles Rothen	1 June 2025
435.	The Schnapps Age and the Little Chicken Man	The UFO abduction of Kristina Florence	Murder of Jabez Spann	8 June 2025
436.	Mayoral Messages and a Lemonade Haunting	The Dead Presidents Pub	Disappearance of Nevaeh Kingbird	15 June 2025
437.	A Crisis Mode Twisted Tea and a Clumsy Guardian Angel	The Baleroy Mansion	Murders of Abigail Williams and Liberty German (Part 1)	22 June 2025
438.	The Mighty S.S. Leona and an Unexpected Pasta Experience	Colossal Claude, AKA the Columbia Bar Serpent	Murders of Abigail Williams and Liberty German (Part 2)	29 June 2025
439.	Office Ghosts and Haunted Desk Drinks	The Legend of Huggin' Molly	Murder of Jason Corbett	6 July 2025
440.	WeWorking with Ghosts and Devil's Lettuce Friend Tattoos	The Dunhill Motel	Murder of Amy Gellert	13 July 2025
441.	Canada's Sweetheart and Wingman of the Century (Live Show in Vancouver)	Deadman's Island	The Vancouver Milkshake Murder	20 July 2025
442.	Interdimensional Naps and Synchronicity Seafood Dinners	The Five Fisherman Restaurant	Murder of Rachel Winkler	27 July 2025
443.	A Chicken Run Playlist and a License to Clown	Sleepover Urban Legends featuring Jeri and Ciara from Ladies & Tangents		3 August 2025
444.	A Long Island Iced Tea Bit and a Kaleidoscope of Jewelry	The Skirrid Inn	Murder of Sophie Lionnet	10 August 2025
445.	Fish Beneficiaries and Croissant Redemption Societies	The Old Melbourne Gaol	Jade Janks and Tom Merriman	17 August 2025
446.	Erratic Earthquake Cocktails and Ghostly Gay Icons	Sam the Sandown Clown, AKA All Colors Sam	The Phantom of Heilbronn, AKA The Woman Without a Face	24 August 2025
447.	Hom Appliance Hauntings and Narcissists in White	Jan Wolski and the Emilcin Abduction	William Bradford Bishop Jr.	31 August 2025
448.	Swimfluencer Celebrations and Microphone Zits	The Moberly-Jourdain Incident, AKA The Versailles Time Slip	Murder of Betsy Faria	7 September 2025
449.	Emotionally Damaged Water Bottles and Ghost Marriage Fights - featuring Creeps and Crimes	The Smurl Family Haunting	Murders of Half & Susanne Zantop	14 September 2025
450.	Estate Sale Unboxings and Open-Eyed Naps	Tokoloshe	Murder of Lori Annalise Paige	21 September 2025
451.	Labubu Covens and Immortal Butt Portals	Ellen Sadler, AKA The Sleeping Girl of Turville	Murder of Blaze Bernstein	28 September 2025
452.	Sleep Paralysis Fashion and Pick Me Ghost (Special All Creeps Episode with Morgan Harris of Creeps & Crimes).	The Hat Man & Emily Morgan Hotel		5 October 2025
453.	Corporate Birthday Winks and Designated Pony Drivers	The Hell Fire Club	Disappearance of Mary Boyle	12 October 2025
454.	Graveyard Kids and Barney Scandals	History of Graveyards	Disappearance of Helen Brach	19 October 2025
455.	Halloween Boy Math and Jerry Springer Ghosts	6304 Beryl Road Haunting	Sheila von Wiese-Mack	26 October 2025
456.	Town Hall Friends and Costume Condom-gate	Seven Sisters Road	Chelsea Bruck	2 November 2025
457.	Segway Fun Facts and Inflatable Birthday Tiaras	Cincinnati Music Hall	Maureen "Cookie" Rowan	9 November 2025
458.	Rat Slaps and Sklorching Demons	The Nameless Thing of Berkely Square	Robert "Bobby" Dunbar and Bruce Anderson	16 November 2025
459.	Radioactive Acorns and Chicken Tricks	The Kecksburg Incident	Lawrence Joseph Bader	23 November 2025
460.	Haunting Snapchats and Screening Calls From Space - Live from Houston, TX	The Hotel Galvez	Lisa Nowak	30 November 2025
461.	Houdini Hat Men and Intertwined Ghost Toes	Copper Queen Hotel	Daneil Robinson	7 December 2025
462.	Dream Mall Rats and Whislteblowing Dogs	The Jane Addams Hull House	Lauren Cho	14 December 2025
463.	The Santa Dilemma and Our Haunted One-Man Show	The Dumas Brothel	Erin Paterson and the Mushroom Murders	21 December 2025
464.	Cats at Holiday Parties and Movie Magic Milkshakes: Live Show at the Hollywood Improv	Pantages Theater	Clara Phillips, AKA The Tiger Woman	28 December 2025
465.	Non-Parallel Traumas and Neighborhood App Ghosts	Mary E. Hart, AKA Midnight Mary	The Fort Worth Trio	11 January 2026

=== Listener stories volumes ===
Listener stories vol.
	Topic/theme	Release date
1.		1 March 2017
2.		1 April 2017
3.		1 May 2017
4.		1 June 2017
5.		1 July 2017
6.		1 August 2017
7.		1 September 2017
8.		1 October 2017
9.		2 November 2017
10.		1 December 2017
11.		1 January 2018
12.		1 February 2018
13.		1 March 2018
14.	April Fool's Day: Hosted by Alex Scheifer, Alison Goforth, and Blaise Lampanelli portraying Em, Christine, and Gio respectively.	1 April 2018
15.		1 May 2018
17.		1 June 2018
18.		1 July 2018
19.		1 August 2018
20.		1 September 2018
21.	Friendly ghosts.	1 October 2018
22.		1 November 2018
23.	Holiday.	1 December 2018
24.		1 January 2019
25.		1 February 2019
26.		1 March 2019
27.	90s themed.	1 April 2019
28.		1 May 2019
29.		1 June 2019
30.		1 July 2019
31.	Cowboys.	1 August 2019
32.	Mirrors.	1 September 2019
33.	Scariest thing that's every happened.	1 October 2019
34.	Doppelgänger.	1 November 2019
35.	Creepy twin tales.	1 December 2019
36.	Badass grandparent stories.	1 January 2020
37.	Soul mate, romance, other-worldly connection stories.	1 February 2020
38.		1 March 2020
39.		1 April 2020
40.	Past life and ghost stories.	1 May 2020
41.	Birthday themed.	1 June 2020
42.	Astral projection.	1 July 2020
43.	Synchronicities.	1 August 2020
44.	Spooky real life stories.	1 September 2020
45.		1 October 2020
46.	Bonus special. Hauntings and true crime.	15 October 2020
47.	Black Eyed Kids.	1 November 2020
48.	Bonus special. Potato themed.	15 November 2020
49.	Full moon stories.	1 December 2020
50.	Bonus special. "How ATWWD Cursed Me".	15 December 2020
51.		1 January 2021
52.		1 February 2021
53.	Cryptid Poetry Slam.	1 March 2021
54.		1 April 2021
55.		1 May 2021
56.	Recent topics, unusual hauntings, birthday themed stories.	1 June 2021
57.		1 July 2021
58.	Pregnancy stories.	1 August 2021
59.		1 September 2021
60.	Halloween.	1 October 2021
61.	******	1 November 2021
62.	Holiday. ******	1 December 2021
63.	Themeless.	1 January 2022
64.		1 February 2022
65.		1 March 2022
66.	Beach Too Sandy, Water Too Wet setup. ****	1 April 2022
67.		1 May 2022
68	Scorpio Stories	1 June 2022
69.	Themeless.	1 July 2022
70.	Armchair Hauntings	1 August 2022
71.	Spooky scandals.	1 September 2022
72.	Halloween/spooky/autumnal.	1 October 2022
73.	Trucker stories.	1 November 2022
74.	"Home for the holidays" stories.	1 December 2022
75.	Themeless.	1 January 2023
76.	"Stories for another day", and Valentine's Day stories.	1 February 2023
77.	Synchronicities.	1 March 2023
78.	Poltergeists and pranks.	1 April 2023
79.	True crime, family drama, and Ancestry.com-related stories.	1 May 2023
80.	Gemini themed stories for birthday month (redemption for last year).	1 June 2023
81.	Themeless.	1 July 2023
82.	Haunted dolls.	1 August 2023
83.	Travel.	1 September 2023
84.	Doppelgängers, black eyed kids, hauntings, past lives.	1 October 2023
85.	Dia de los Muertos, dowsing rods, and ghost hunting stories.	1 November 2023
86.	Christine's mysteriously mailed tintype photos, a Duggars-adjacent story, and an overall festive theme.	1 December 2023
87.	Stories with remote connections to previous episodes.	1 January 2024
88.	Themeless	1 February 2024
89.	Themeless*******	1 March 2024
90.	Two truths and a lie.	1 April 2024
91.	Mysteries.	1 May 2024
92.	Hosts's favorite themes for their birthdays.	1 June 2024
93.	Whaley House.	1 July 2024
94.	True crime.	1 August 2024
95.	Fate.	1 September 2024
96.	Spooky Halloween stories.	1 October 2024
97.		1 November 2024
98.		1 December 2024
99.		1 January 2025
100.	The 100th Episode: Best of Compilation	1 February 2025
101.	Ghosts	1 March 2025
102.	April Fool's Day themed stories	1 April 2025

=== Key ===
* Special Guest Deirdre Klima

** Special Guest Lisa Lampanelli

*** For this episode, Schulz and Schiefer switched roles, with Schulz telling a crime story and Schiefer telling a paranormal one.

**** Special Guest Alexander Schiefer

***** First episode to be video-recorded and uploaded to YouTube.

****** Special Guest Allison Goforth

******* Special Guests Trevin and Amanda from Live, Laugh, Larceny

Christine Schiefer on maternity leave, Eva Gross filled in as guest-host.
Christine Schiefer on maternity leave, Alexander Schiefer filled in as guest-host.
Christine Schiefer on maternity leave, Kenyon Laing of Wine and Crime filled in as guest-host.
Christine Schiefer on maternity leave, Lucy Fitzgerald of Wine and Crime filled in as guest-host.
Christine Schiefer on maternity leave, Amanda Jacobson of Wine and Crime filled in as guest-host.
Christine Schiefer on maternity leave, husband Blaise Lampugnale filled in as guest-host.
Themed listener episode.
Special episode.
