= Voice from the Grave (film) =

- Based on: Unsolved Mysteries
- Written by: Bill Phillips; Edithe Swensen
- Directed by: David Jackson
- Starring: Kevin Dobson; Megan Ward; John Terlesky; Michael Riley; Kim Dickens
- Music by: Peter Bernstein
- Country of origin: United States
- Original language: English

Production
- Producers: Richard L. O'Connor; John Cosgrove; Terry Dunn Meurer; Shari Adagio; Stephen Soyland
- Cinematography: Denis Maloney
- Editor: Adam Wolfe
- Running time: 86 minutes
- Production company: Sony Pictures Home Entertainment

Original release
- Release: April 22, 1996

Voice from the Grave, also known as From the Files of Unsolved Mysteries: Voice from the Grave and Crimes of Passion: Voice from the Grave, is a 1996 television film based on a real-life case from the Unsolved Mysteries television series. The film was written by Bill Phillips and directed by David Jackson.

== Premise ==
A segment from the Unsolved Mysteries TV series, the February 1977 murder of 47-year-old respiratory therapist Teresita Basa in Chicago, Illinois, inspired this story, in which a nurse (Megan Ward) claims that she is possessed by a murdered co-worker's spirit which identifies the killer.

== Cast ==
- Kevin Dobson as Detective Joe Stachula
- Megan Ward as Renee Perkins
- John Terlesky as Bill Perkins
- Michael Riley as Adam Schuster
- Kim Dickens as Terry Deveroux
- Robert Knepper as Milosh
- Kelli Williams as Yvonne Shuster
- John Carroll Lynch as Prosecutor O'Gane
- Michael Mantell as Attorney Smith
- Eric Menyuk as Nate Bradshaw

== Releases ==
The television film originally aired on NBC on April 22, 1996, and was later released on Region 2 DVD.
