= McRaven House =

Historic house in Mississippi, United States

- Bobb House
- U.S. National Register of Historic Places
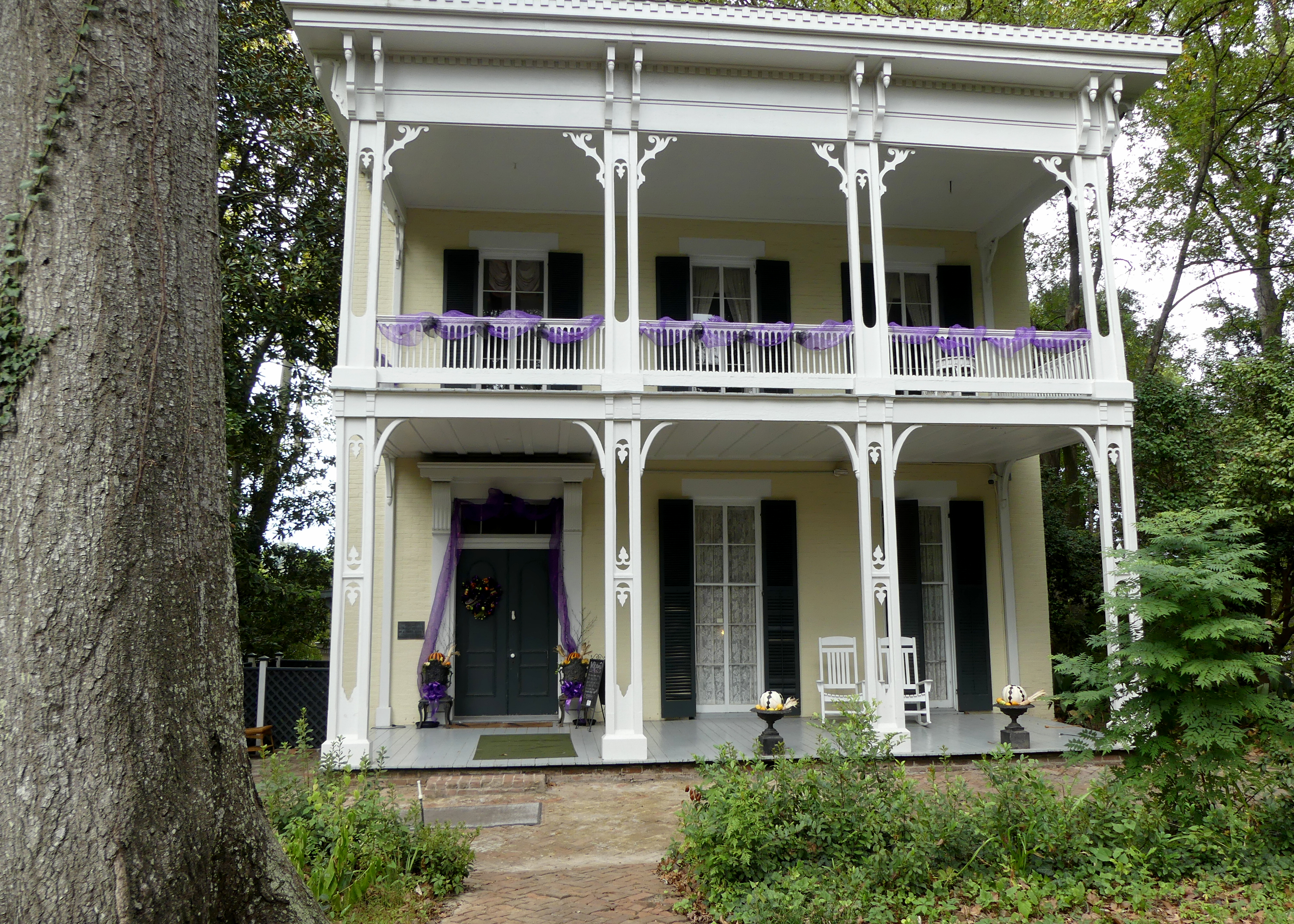
- McRaven House with Halloween decorations

- Location within Mississippi Location within the United States
- Location: 1503 Harrison St., Vicksburg, Mississippi
- Coordinates: 32°20′45″N 90°52′21″W
- Built: 1797
- Architectural style: Greek Revival, Empire, Frontier
- NRHP reference No.: 79001337
- Added to NRHP: January 8, 1979

McRaven was built c. 1797 by Andrew Glass in a town called Walnut Hills, which is now Vicksburg, Mississippi. In the Civil War era, it was known as the Bobb House, and it is listed on the National Register of Historic Places as such. McRaven got its current name from the street it is located on, which was formerly called McRaven Street, but is now Harrison Street. McRaven has been on the Mississippi Department of Archives and History's Historic Preservation list since January 8, 1978. It is also believed by many to be haunted and has been called "the most haunted house in Mississippi."

== History ==
The first part of what is now McRaven was built by Andrew Glass ca. 1797 and originally serving as a way station for pioneers en route to Nashville, Tennessee along the Natchez Trace to the Mississippi River. As first built, McRaven consisted of only a kitchen with one room above it, this part of the house is now known as the "Pioneer Section".

In 1836, Sheriff Stephen Howard bought the house and added the middle dining room and the bedroom above it, built in Empire architectural style. Sheriff Howard's wife Mary Elizabeth Howard died during childbirth in late August 1836 in the middle bedroom.

The house was purchased by John H. Bobb in 1849, Bobb built the rest of the house in Greek Revival style. During the Civil War's 1863 Siege of Vicksburg, McRaven was used as a Confederate field hospital and camp site. Since it was located so close to the railroad, a major point of battle, the house was battered by cannon blasts from both the Union and Confederate forces. However, it still stands.

On May 18, 1864, the wealthy John Bobb, picked up a brick and threw it at a group of the 46th USCI marching back to their regiment from picket duty. Bobb's Harrison St. home laid adjacent to the RR tracks where nearby soldiers bivouacked, and he was offended the "Freedom" fighters were crossing on his property. In 1860, census records show Bobb was a "farmer" who enslaved 22 African Americans on this parcel of property. The brick hit U.S. Sgt. William Anderson in the head, fracturing his skull. Sgt. Anderson, in defense to the attack, shot Bobb in the head and the bowels, resulting in Bobb's death. Sgt. Anderson was subject of a Court Martial investigation which found him "Not Guilty" of malice for shooting a "citizen." Sgt. Anderson died in August, while stationed at Milliken's Bend, leaving a widow and a small child behind. U.S. Sgt. Anderson is one of the "Unknowns" buried in Vicksburg National Cemetery. John's widow Selina Bobb sold the house to a realtor in 1869 and moved to a family plantation outside of New Orleans, Louisiana called Sunnyside.

McRaven was eventually sold to William Murray in 1882. Murray and his wife Ellen Flynn raised four daughters and three sons in McRaven. William Murray died at the house in 1911, his wife Ellen died there in 1921, their daughter Ida died in 1946, and a son died in 1950, all in McRaven. From this point on, William's daughters Annie and Ella Murray, both unmarried, lived alone in the house with no modern conveniences aside from a telephone, and no contact with the outside world except their doctor, Walter Johnston. In 1960, Ella Murray died at the age of 81, and her sister Annie sold the house after moving to a nursing home. At this point, the house was in such disrepair that neighbors and nearby residents had no idea it existed. The upper story was completely overgrown with vines and the sisters had resorted to chopping up the antique furniture for firewood.

In 1960, McRaven was purchased by O.E. Bradway and with cosmetic restoration it was opened to the public for touring in 1961. The house was placed on the National Register of Historical Places on January 8, 1979. Later that year, Bradway sold McRaven and some of the furnishings to Charles and Sandra Harvey for $75,000. After the spring pilgrimage, the Harvey's closed the house and took on a yearlong restoration at a cost near $100,000. The restoration included such things as woodwork, rewiring, plumbing and plastering. A master at plaster restorations, Mr. Little of Jackson took on the extraordinary task of plastering all the walls and ceilings and restoring the Greek Revival cornices and ceiling medallions. Having samples of the original carpet from the John Bobb era, Mrs. Harvey found a company in Georgia to reproduce the carpet for the parlor, front entry, stairwell and upstairs front bedroom. She also did extensive research on each period of the house to have authentic paint, wallpaper, fabrics and furnishings for the public. The front and rear porch were in disrepair and had been roped off by Bradway. Lincoln Brown with the Waterways Experimental Station rebuilt both front and rear porches. While in the attic, Mr. Harvey discovered many rafters had been damaged from the Union's shelling and needed repair. The 1840 privy which was purchased by Bradway from the Vick House was also repaired. Once again ready for touring, the Vicksburg Sunday Post featured McRaven's spring pilgrimage open house in their April 6, 1980, issue. McRaven had been returned to her authentic glory. Though the Harveys and their two children never lived in the house, they spent many nights in the Howard's bedroom protecting the home from vandals. In 1984, The Harveys moved to Natchez and sold McRaven to Leyland French for $275,000.

In 1984, Leyland French purchased McRaven and did further restoration, French was the first owner since the Murrays to reside in the house. Aside from a modern kitchen and bathroom in its basement, McRaven has remained largely unchanged since the 19th century. For this reason, McRaven was featured in the July 1963 issue of National Geographic Magazine which called it the "Time Capsule of the South."

== Notable tour guests ==
Among the thousands of visitors to McRaven since it opened for tours in 1961, are Max Baer, Jr. and Irene Ryan of the sitcom The Beverly Hillbillies, who toured the house in the mid-1960s—an autographed photo of them at the house hangs in the foyer of McRaven.

== In the media ==
=== Television ===
The McRaven House was featured on an episode of Ghost Adventures entitled "Ghosts of Vicksburg: McRaven Mansion" that aired as a special in 2018 on the Travel Channel. The team of paranormal investigators explored the home and its grounds which was used as a Confederate campsite during the Civil War. They investigated reports of the aggressive ghost of Andrew Glass, a highwayman who was murdered by his jealous wife long ago.

=== Other media ===
In 2025, a skeptical CNN travel writer participated in a ghost hunt at McRaven and wrote about the experience. The article details accounts of that evening as well as multiple reports of hauntings experienced by staff and tour guides.
