= Murder of Sharron Prior =

1975 high profile child murder in Quebec, Canada

- Sharron Prior c.1975
- Location: Abduction: Montreal, Quebec, Canada; Murder scene: Longueuil, Quebec, Canada
- Date: 29 March 1975; 51 years ago c. 7:15 p.m
- Attack type: Child abduction, child murder
- Victim: Sharron Prior
- No. of participants: 1
- Accused: Franklin Maywood Romine

The murder of Sharron Prior was a high-profile child murder that occurred in Pointe-Saint-Charles neighbourhood of Montreal, Quebec, Canada. Sharron Prior, a 16-year-old schoolgirl was abducted after she left her home to meet friends at a nearby pizzeria on 29 March 1975. On 1 April 1975, her body was found in a vacant lot in the nearby city of Longueuil, Quebec. She had been raped, beaten and suffocated. Her murder remained unsolved for 48 years and was considered a high-profile case in Quebec.

A break in the case occurred in June 2022, when DNA evidence was identified on a man's T-shirt. DNA testing matched Franklin Maywood Romine, who had died in 1982. Romine's body was exhumed from a West Virginia cemetery for further DNA testing.

On 23 May 2023, it was confirmed that the DNA found on Prior's body matched Romine; he also matched a physical description of a suspect provided by a witness, and Romine's car was compatible with the tire tracks found near Prior's body.

== Background ==
Sharron Kim Prior was born on 9 February 1959 to Yvonne Prior; she had twin younger sisters, Doreen and Moreen, two years younger than her, and a brother, who was the youngest. Both sisters said Prior was a "kind, warm-hearted young girl who dreamed of being a veterinarian." Sharron's father was in the Canadian military. Sharron's parents had divorced.

== Murder ==
=== Disappearance ===
On 29 March 1975, Prior left her house around 7 pm to meet some friends and her boyfriend at a nearby pizzeria in Wellington Street, Pointe-Saint-Charles, but never arrived. When she had not returned home by 11 pm, her mother Yvonne reported her disappearance to the police. Police and volunteers began a major search in Pointe-Saint-Charles to find Prior.

=== Discovery ===
Three days later, Prior's body was found in a wooded area of Longueuil, across the St. Lawrence River from Montreal. A man's T-shirt had been used to restrain her and tire tracks were found at the crime scene.

== Investigation ==
=== Autopsy ===
Autopsies revealed she had been raped, beaten and suffocated. DNA had been extracted from Prior's shirt, however it was insufficient to be tested. Nonetheless, it was kept over the years in the hopes that it could someday be used to find a match.

=== Connection to an attempted kidnapping ===
At the same time of Prior's disappearance, a 22-year-old woman reported that a tall, white, English-speaking man with blue eyes, brown hair, and a mustache attempted to kidnap her at knifepoint. It had happened on the same street that Prior was abducted and the suspicion was raised that it was the same perpetrator.

=== Later advances ===
In June 2022, advances in DNA testing technology made it possible for investigators to conduct DNA testing. DNA had been extracted from the T-shirt found at the original crime scene.

In May 2023, Prior's murder was solved thanks to new DNA testing techniques and the persistence of Prior's family. The police revealed that the DNA matched the Romine family, from Charleston, West Virginia, United States. The DNA samples had been sent to a laboratory in West Virginia, and then matched to Romine's relatives using genealogical websites. As a result, police required that the body of Franklin Maywood Romine, who died in 1982, be exhumed. Éric Racicot, the Longueuil Police detective on the case, said local databases showed Romine had two addresses in Montreal and Longueuil at the time of the murder of Prior. Romine had an extensive criminal record and had encounters with Montreal and American police, including one rape conviction, but was not initially a suspect in Prior's killing.

Franklin Romine's DNA matched with the evidence found at Prior's murder scene and his physical description matched that of the man who tried to abduct the woman on Wellington Street. Additionally, Romine's car was compatible with the tire tracks found near Prior's body, confirming that Romine was Prior's murderer. Since Romine is dead, no charges were called against him and the case has now been closed.

Prior's sister Doreen said, "The solving of Sharron's case will never bring Sharron back, but knowing that her killer is no longer on this Earth and won't kill anymore, brings us to somewhat of a closure."

== See also ==
- Crime in Canada
- List of solved missing person cases: 1950–1999
