= Miriam Rodríguez Martínez =

Mexican human rights activist (1960–2017)

- Born: Miriam Elizabeth Rodríguez Martínez; 5 February 1960; San Fernando, Tamaulipas, Mexico
- Died: 10 May 2017 (aged 57); San Fernando, Tamaulipas, Mexico
- Occupation: Human rights activist
- Years active: 2014–2017

Miriam Elizabeth Rodríguez Martínez (5 February 1960 – 10 May 2017) was a Mexican human rights activist. She became one of the many "Missing Child Parents" (a class of victims of organized crime, labeled as such by local news media), after her daughter was abducted and killed. On 10 May 2017, Rodríguez was shot dead by gunmen who had broken into her home.

== Biography ==
=== Early life ===
Miriam Elizabeth Rodríguez Martínez was born on 5 February 1960 in San Fernando in the Mexican state of Tamaulipas.

=== Kidnapping of Karen Rodríguez ===
Miriam's daughter, Karen Alejandra Salinas Rodríguez, was kidnapped in 2012. The family paid a ransom using a loan from a bank that offered credit for such payments, but she was not released. Miriam Rodríguez later met with members of the Zetas cartel in an effort to locate her. Her daughter's remains were discovered in 2014.

Rodríguez launched her own investigation, disguising herself to collect information on those responsible. Over three years, she helped locate nearly all members of the group that had kidnapped her daughter, resulting in ten of them being captured. Rodríguez later founded a collective of families of the disappeared.

=== Death ===
Rodríguez was killed on 10 May 2017, the day Mexico celebrates Mother's Day. She was shot 12 times by gunmen who broke into her home, and died on her way to the hospital. In solidarity, protesters raised their voices in protest the day she was killed, calling on the Mexican and U.S. governments to ensure the safety of human rights defenders. Mexican authorities vowed to pursue those responsible.

Rodríguez was posthumously honored with a plaque in San Fernando’s central plaza.
