= Disappearances of Terrance Williams and Felipe Santos =

2003–2004 missing persons cases in the US

Missing persons flier of Terrance Williams and Felipe Santos

Terrance Williams and Felipe Santos went missing in 2004 and 2003, respectively, under similar circumstances in Naples, Florida, U.S. Both men were last seen being arrested by Steve Calkins, then a deputy in the Collier County Sheriff's Department, for driving without a license. Calkins claims that he changed his mind about both arrests, and last saw the men after he dropped them at Circle K convenience stores.

On September 4, 2018, actor, director, and producer Tyler Perry offered a $200,000 reward for any information leading to the location of the men or an arrest in the case. Al Sharpton of the National Action Network and Ben Jealous of the NAACP also joined Perry in raising awareness of the case. The disappearances were covered by multiple television shows, such as the Investigation Discovery series Disappeared and Never Seen Again.

== Disappearance of Terrance Williams ==
Terrance Williams
- Born: January 17, 1976; Chattanooga, Tennessee, U.S.
- Disappeared: January 12, 2004 (aged 27); Naples, Florida, U.S.
- Status: Missing for 22 years, 8 months and 22 days
- Known for: Missing person
- Height: 5 ft 8 in (173 cm)

On January 12, 2004, 27-year-old Terrance Williams went missing in Naples, Florida. Williams, a native of Chattanooga, Tennessee and father of four children, had recently moved to Florida to be near his mother, Marcia. Williams's roommate, Jason Gonzalez, says he spoke to Terrance on the phone on the evening of Sunday, January 11, before heading to bed. Williams, who had attended a party that evening at a co-worker's house, did not then have a valid driver's license after being cited for driving under the influence, and the registration on his car had expired. He decided to drive to the party illegally after being unable to find another ride. Gonzalez became concerned when Williams did not return home and emailed Marcia on January 13 about his concerns.

== Initial investigation ==
The Williams family called police and filed a missing persons report. Shortly afterward, Williams's aunt was able to track down his Cadillac, which had been towed from Naples Memorial Cemetery after obstructing traffic. The tow report was signed by Deputy Steve Calkins of the Collier County Sheriff's Department. The family contacted the sheriff's department, and discovered that Calkins had not filed an incident report, nor had he made an arrest.

Marcia contacted workers at the cemetery, who told her that they witnessed Calkins pull Williams over and ask him for identification, which he did not have. Employees stated that Calkins patted Williams down and put him in the back of his patrol car. Before driving off with Williams, Calkins then asked the cemetery employees if he could leave the Cadillac in the lot. Calkins was witnessed returning to the cemetery between fifteen minutes and an hour later, and moving the Cadillac from a parking spot to the side of the road. The car keys were found on the ground beside the car. Following this witness statement, the Williams family repeatedly called the sheriff's department asking to speak to Calkins. Upon being contacted by dispatch, Calkins claimed to have no memory of making any arrests or having any cars towed on the day of Williams's disappearance. He was contacted later, and claimed to have a somewhat better recollection of his contact with Williams.

A few days later, Calkins's supervisors asked him to submit an incident report. Calkins's report states that he first came in contact with Williams at 12:15 pm, after noticing that his car was driving "in distress". The cemetery employees recalled the stop happening at 9 or 10 am, a claim which is seemingly supported by the fact that Williams' shift that day was scheduled to begin at 10 am. Calkins claimed he followed Williams to the cemetery parking lot, and that he had asked for a ride to a nearby Circle K convenience store because he was late for work (Williams did not work at the Circle K). According to Calkins, after dropping him off at the Circle K, Williams told him the paperwork for the car was in the vehicle's glove compartment. Calkins claimed that he returned to the Cadillac, and discovered that the proper registration was not in the car, and that he felt deceived, so he called Circle K from his work-issued cell phone and asked to speak to Williams. The clerk allegedly told him over the phone that Williams did not work there. According to the report, Calkins then called in the license plate number, and found that the plates were expired. However, further investigation revealed that phone and surveillance records did not back up Calkins's story: there was no sign of Williams or Calkins on surveillance footage from the Circle K, and the phone records from Calkins's cell phone showed no call to the Circle K. Circle K employees were interviewed, and no witnesses could be found to place Calkins or Williams there. At this point, Marcia filed a complaint against Calkins.

A new lead in the case surfaced when the Mexican Consulate in Miami contacted Marcia to tell her about another man who had vanished in a similar fashion. Mexican immigrant Felipe Santos had gone missing three months prior, after Calkins claimed he dropped him off at another Circle K, approximately four miles from the location where he claimed he dropped off Williams.

== Disappearance of Felipe Santos ==
Felipe Santos
- Born: May 26, 1980; Oaxaca, Mexico
- Disappeared: October 14, 2003 (aged 23); Naples, Florida, U.S.
- Status: Missing for 23 years and 3 days
- Known for: Missing person
- Height: 5 ft 7 in (170 cm)
- Spouse: Apolonia Cruz-Cortez

Felipe Santos, 23, was a Mexican national living illegally in the U.S. in nearby Immokalee, Florida. He had been living in the U.S. for three years at the time of his disappearance, and was sending money back to his family in Mexico. Santos was last seen October 14, 2003, at approximately 6:30 am. He was driving to work with his two brothers when he was involved in a minor car accident in Naples. Calkins cited Santos for reckless driving and driving without a license or insurance, and placed him in his patrol car. Santos was last seen riding away with Calkins.

Later that day, Santos's boss contacted the county jail to post bail, and it was discovered that Santos was never booked. Calkins claimed that he changed his mind about the arrest, because Santos was "polite and cooperative", left him at a local Circle K, and drove off. The reason for leaving Santos at a Circle K is unclear, as his place of work was close by and his foreman was on the way to pick him and his brothers up from the scene of the car accident. The other driver in the accident said that Calkins was agitated about Santos's lack of documentation. "He just stated that he was tired of pulling people over that didn't have licenses," she said. In either case, there is no evidence that Santos ever arrived at the Circle K. Calkins' location after leaving the site of the accident was uncertain or unaccounted for nearly two hours.

On October 29, two weeks later, after Calkins submitted his incident report, Santos's family filed a missing persons report, as well as a complaint against Calkins. An internal investigation cleared Calkins of any wrongdoing on November 27. Santos' wife, Apolonia Cruz-Cortez, has questioned the quality of the investigation into the disappearance, citing the fact that she has not been interviewed by investigators.

== Further investigation ==
Further suspicion was cast on Calkins when a recording of his call to dispatch requesting the tow of Williams's car revealed further conflicting statements. In this recording, Calkins described the car as abandoned and blocking the road. This statement contradicted both his incident report and the witness statements, both of which reported that Calkins himself moved the vehicle to its location blocking the road. Calkins joked with the operator: "Maybe he's out there in the cemetery. He'll come back and his car will be gone." He was also heard using inappropriate language during the call, describing the car as a "homie Cadillac", and as a "piece of junk Cadillac". Calkins defended his misstatements to the operator, telling investigators that he was just "joking around" with a coworker. Calkins insisted he moved the car to assist the towing company, as opposed to attempting to make it look abandoned. Calkins also claimed in the recording that the car was disabled, which Williams' family objects to, as a family member drove the car home from the tow yard.

Approximately twenty minutes later, at 1:12 pm, Calkins requested a background check on "Terrance Williams", giving an inaccurate birth date—a specific date that Williams had previously given the police when he was arrested. This contradicts Calkins's earlier statement that he never knew Williams's last name or any other personal details. After this call, Calkins was unaccounted for nearly an hour; this period may actually be closer to two hours, as Calkins' claims of other activities are not corroborated by any documentation.

Calkins took three polygraph tests, one of which was inconclusive, one which indicated honesty, and one indicating deception.

In this instance, the main person of interest in the case was a police officer, so the Florida Department of Law Enforcement and the FBI were called in to work on the case. Various investigative techniques were used, including the covert placement of a GPS device on Calkins's vehicle, and a forensic investigation of the patrol car. Cadaver dogs were used to survey the areas identified by the GPS, but these turned up no further evidence. Calkins was subsequently fired from the department for providing conflicting information about both missing person cases, and for not cooperating with the investigation.

Williams was legally declared dead in 2009.

After Calkins left Florida in 2016, investigators searched his former home and the land it was on, but no human remains were found.

== Increased publicity and lawsuit ==
The case went without any leads for a number of years until 2012, when a number of national programs began covering the case, including Disappeared, Anderson Cooper 360, and Dateline NBC. In 2017, the Investigation Discovery series Deadline: Crime with Tamron Hall investigated the disappearances of Williams and Santos. Entertainment mogul Tyler Perry went on Al Sharpton's MSNBC talk show to discuss the disappearances, offering a $200,000 reward for information in connection with the cases.

On August 30, 2018, a wrongful death lawsuit was filed against Calkins. The victims' families were represented by civil rights attorney Benjamin Crump. In 2020 Calkins' attorney took a deposition from Marcia Williams, Terrance's mother. Later that year, the case entered non-binding arbitration, with the arbitrator ultimately entering a nonbinding judgment in favor of Calkins. Although the Crump team attempted to appeal, a judge dismissed the case and ruled that Marcia Williams had to pay Calkins around $5,600 for costs related to the lawsuit.

Tyler Perry released a documentary series titled Never Seen Again in May 2022 which addresses the disappearances of the two men.

== Theories ==
One theory posited by the Sheriff's Department is that both men left of their own accord to avoid trouble with the law, as Santos was undocumented and Williams had a warrant related to unpaid child support. However, both men's families deny this, pointing to their strong relationships with their families and children. A Sunoco clerk claimed that he had seen Williams alive in the store on January 19, 2004, but surveillance footage from that day does not show Williams in the building. Workers on the case say there is no evidence that Williams has been seen again since his encounter with Calkins.

A popular theory for the disappearances is the Starlight Tour theory. The term originated in the Canadian province of Saskatchewan, and describes the practice of police driving Indigenous individuals to the edge of town or outside of city limits, and abandoning them to find their own way home or die from the cold. The practice came to light in 2000, when an Indigenous Canadian man named Darrel Night reported being picked up by police after leaving a party, driven to the outside of town, and then dropped off in a rural area in freezing conditions. Night survived after finding a nearby power plant staffed by a security guard. The next morning, another Indigenous man named Rodney Naistus was found frozen to the ground near where Night was dropped off. Lawrence Wegner, also Indigenous, was found deceased weeks later in the same area. According to Russ Sabo, Saskatoon's new police chief, evidence exists that similar drop-offs have gone on since at least the 1970s.

A number of podcasts have explored the theory that Santos and Williams were dropped off in the nearby Everglades, and had died of exposure or other perils. However, NPR podcast The Last Ride claimed in 2023 that Calkins would not have had time to drive to the Everglades, based on his other confirmed locations that day.

One anonymous former sheriff's office employee has suggested additional people besides Calkins may have been involved in the men's disappearances, although no evidence has been uncovered to support this.

== See also ==
- List of kidnappings
- List of people who disappeared mysteriously: post-1970
