= Hotel Monte Vista =

Historic hotel in Flagstaff, Arizona

Coordinates: 35.1982°N 111.6473°W

Hotel Monte Vista

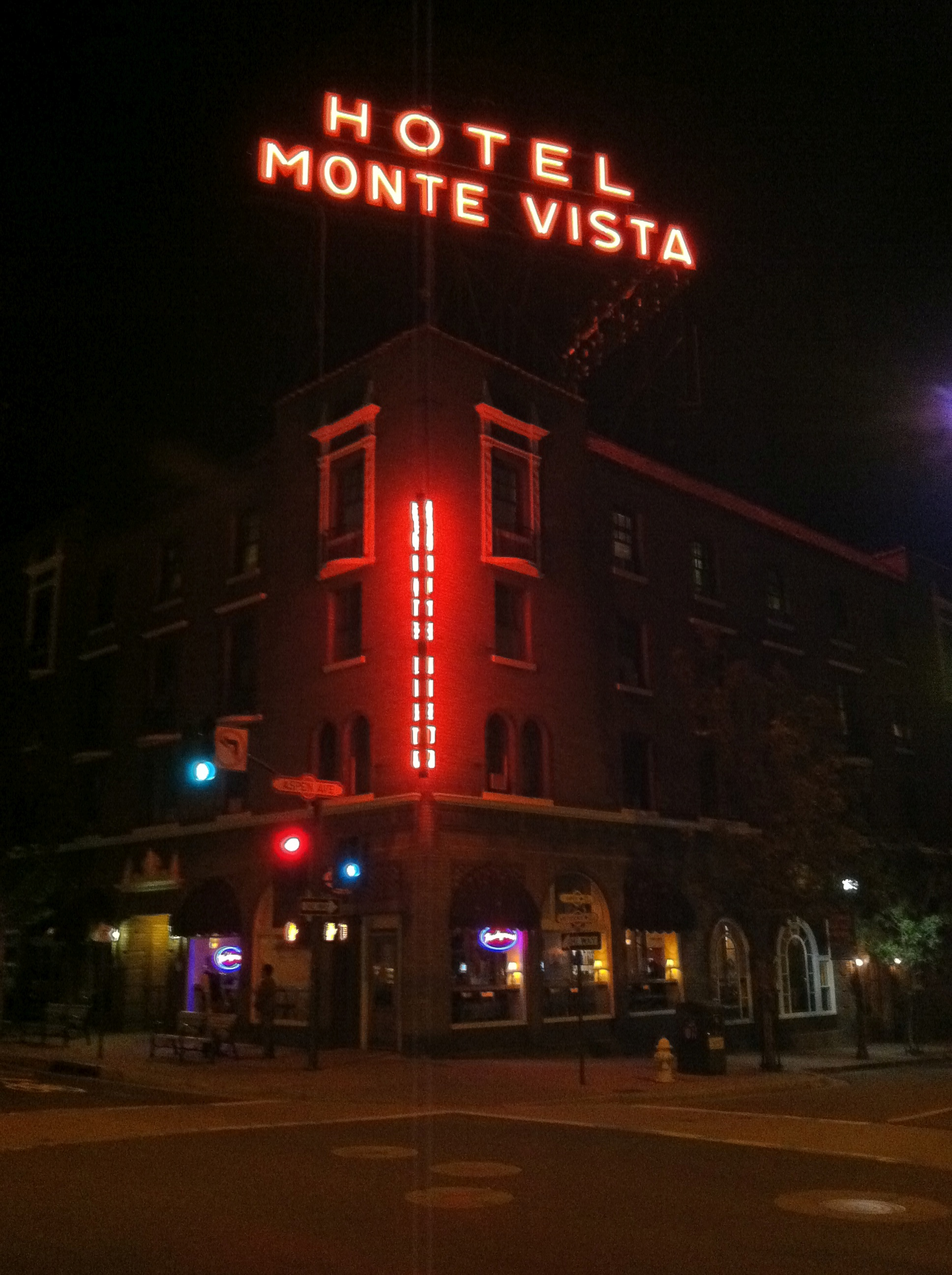
Hotel Monte Vista at night

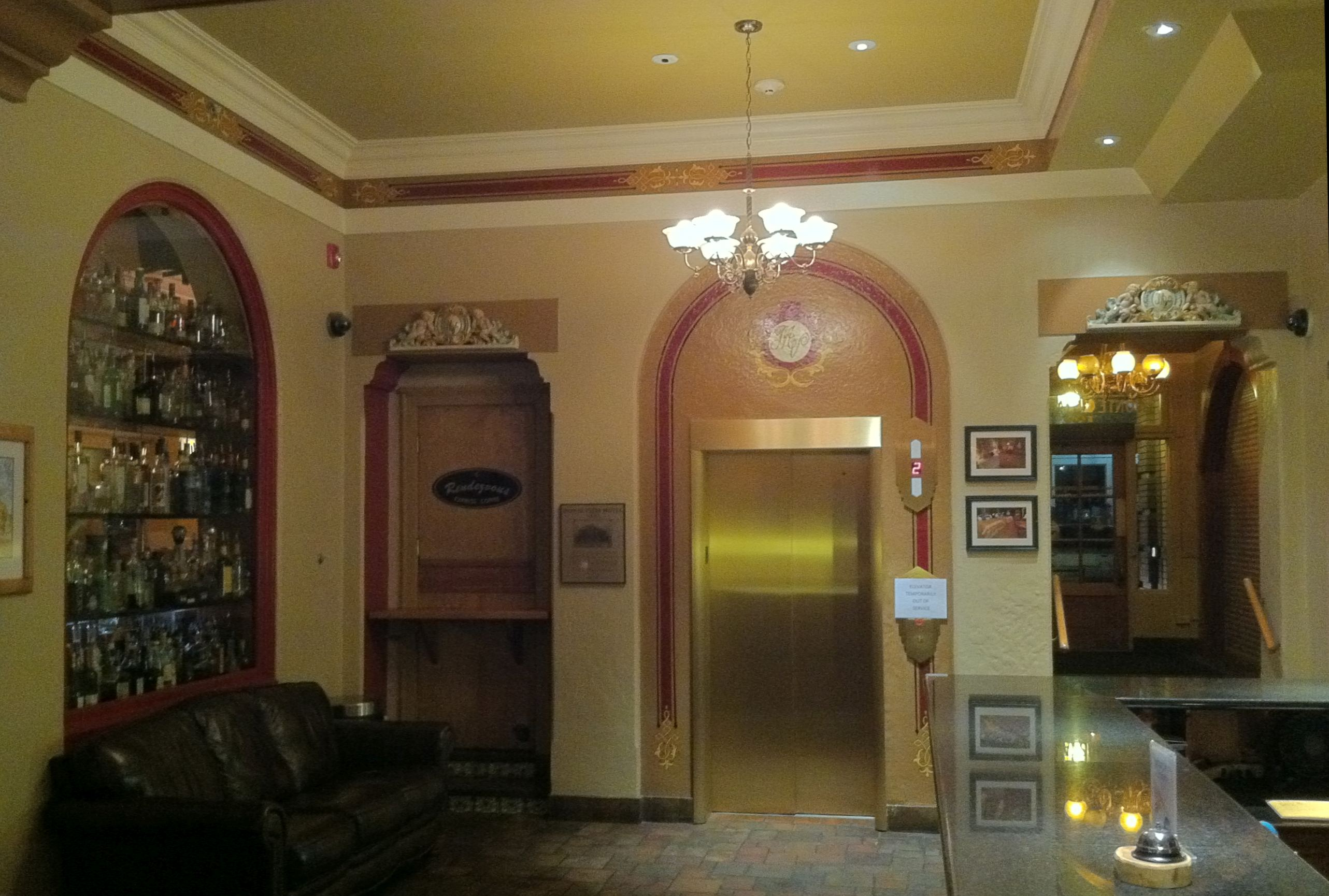
The lobby of the Hotel Monte Vista

The Hotel Monte Vista is a historic hotel near U.S. Route 66 in Flagstaff, Arizona.

== History ==
Hotel Monte Vista was built in 1927 and is in the historic downtown district of Flagstaff. It has 73 rooms and suites on three floors. Many famous people have stayed at the hotel, including John Wayne, Spencer Tracy, Humphrey Bogart, Clark Gable, Anthony Hopkins, Esther Williams, and Barbara Stanwyck.

The hotel is located at 100 North San Francisco Street. The Monte Vista Lounge, or "Monte V" as it is known, is a popular bar and entertainment venue.
