= Queen Mary (ship) =

The following ships are named Queen Mary:

- HMS Queen Mary, a battlecruiser of the Royal Navy that entered service in 1913 and was sunk at the Battle of Jutland in 1916
- TS Queen Mary, a Clyde steamer in service 1933–1977, as of 2023 under restoration on the River Clyde, Scotland
- RMS Queen Mary, a Cunard Line ocean liner in service 1936–1967, now retired as a hotel in Long Beach, California, United States
- RMS Queen Mary 2, a Cunard Line ocean liner that entered service in 2004
