= Minnesota Iceman =

Anthropological hoax

The Minnesota Iceman is a sideshow exhibit and elaborate hoax that depicts a fake man-like creature frozen in a block of ice. It was displayed at shopping malls, state fairs, and carnivals in the United States and Canada in the 1960s and early 1970s and promoted as the "missing link" between Homo sapiens and Neanderthals. It was sold on eBay in 2013 and put on display in Austin, Texas.

== Description ==
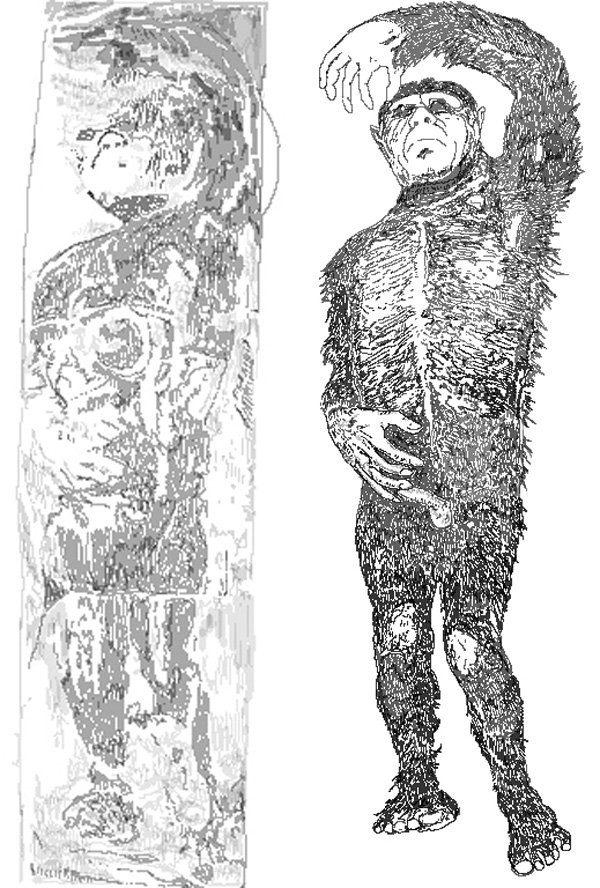
Two views of the Iceman: Frozen, and as described by Sanderson & Heuvelmans

The creature has been described as male, human-like, 6 ft (~1.8 m) tall, hairy, with large hands and feet, very dark brown hair about 3 - 4 inches (~9 cm) long, and a flattened nose. One of its arms appeared to be broken and one of its eyes appeared to have been knocked out of its socket, allegedly by a bullet that was said to have entered the creature's head from behind. After investigating, scientists from the Smithsonian Institution determined that it was likely to be a hoax.

== History ==
Promoter and exhibitor Frank Hansen stated the Minnesota Iceman was discovered in the region of Siberia and that he was acting as its caretaker for an absentee owner he described as an "eccentric California millionaire". Touring carnivals and fairs with the exhibit, Hansen was once reportedly detained by Canada Customs officials, who were concerned he was transporting a human cadaver.

The FBI was informed that the subject might potentially be a human murder victim, but the agency did not investigate, possibly due to many believing it was a hoax.

Sanderson, then science editor for Argosy magazine, authored an article about the Iceman in the April 1969 issue that featured the headline "Is this the missing link between man and the apes?" Sanderson also spoke about the Iceman in television appearances, and contacted primatologist John Napier, asking him to investigate it under the official auspices of the Smithsonian Institution. Hansen subsequently withdrew the Minnesota Iceman from public inspection, saying the withdrawal was on orders from its California-based owner. Hansen later provided a new "Iceman" for exhibit, described by observers as a latex model that was clearly different from the original.

Napier, in conjunction with the Smithsonian, made preliminary investigations of Hansen's affairs and said he found that Hansen had commissioned the creation of the Iceman from a West Coast company in 1967, leading Napier to quickly conclude there was only ever one Iceman latex model that he theorized was re-positioned and refrozen between appearances. Napier stated that "The Smithsonian Institution...is satisfied that the creature is simply a carnival exhibit made of latex rubber and hair...the 'original' model and the present so-called 'substitute' are one and the same."

== 2013 sale ==
In February 2013, the Minnesota Iceman was reportedly auctioned on eBay. The listing read: "This is the actual sideshow gaff billed as 'The Minnesota Iceman' by Frank Hansen in the 1960s. This is a one of a kind hoax that was fabricated by a mid-20th century showman." It was purchased by Austin, Texas, "Museum of the Weird" owner Steve Busti, who has placed it on public display.

== Popular culture ==
The Minnesota Iceman was featured on season 4 episode 6 of the A&E series Shipping Wars as well as season 12 episode 26 of the Travel Channel series Mysteries at the Museum. The story of the iceman was also featured in the 7th-season premiere of the television show Unsolved Mysteries. In "Rock Apes of Vietnam" (Series 1 Episode 9 of the 2019 TV series "In Search of Monsters") the exhibit's current owner Steve Busti and others say that Hansen changed his story about the exhibit's origin 3 times, and that the current exhibit may be a latex replica intended to protect Hansen from legal problems if he killed and illegally imported a "Rock Ape" (an alleged rock-throwing Vietnamese cryptid similar to America's Bigfoot) from Vietnam when he was a military pilot during the Vietnam War.

== See also ==
- Cardiff Giant
- Almas
- Bigfoot
- Homo pongoides (Fr)
