= Devil's Tramping Ground =

Camping spot in Bear Creek, North Carolina, US

Coordinates: 35.584811°N 79.486658°W

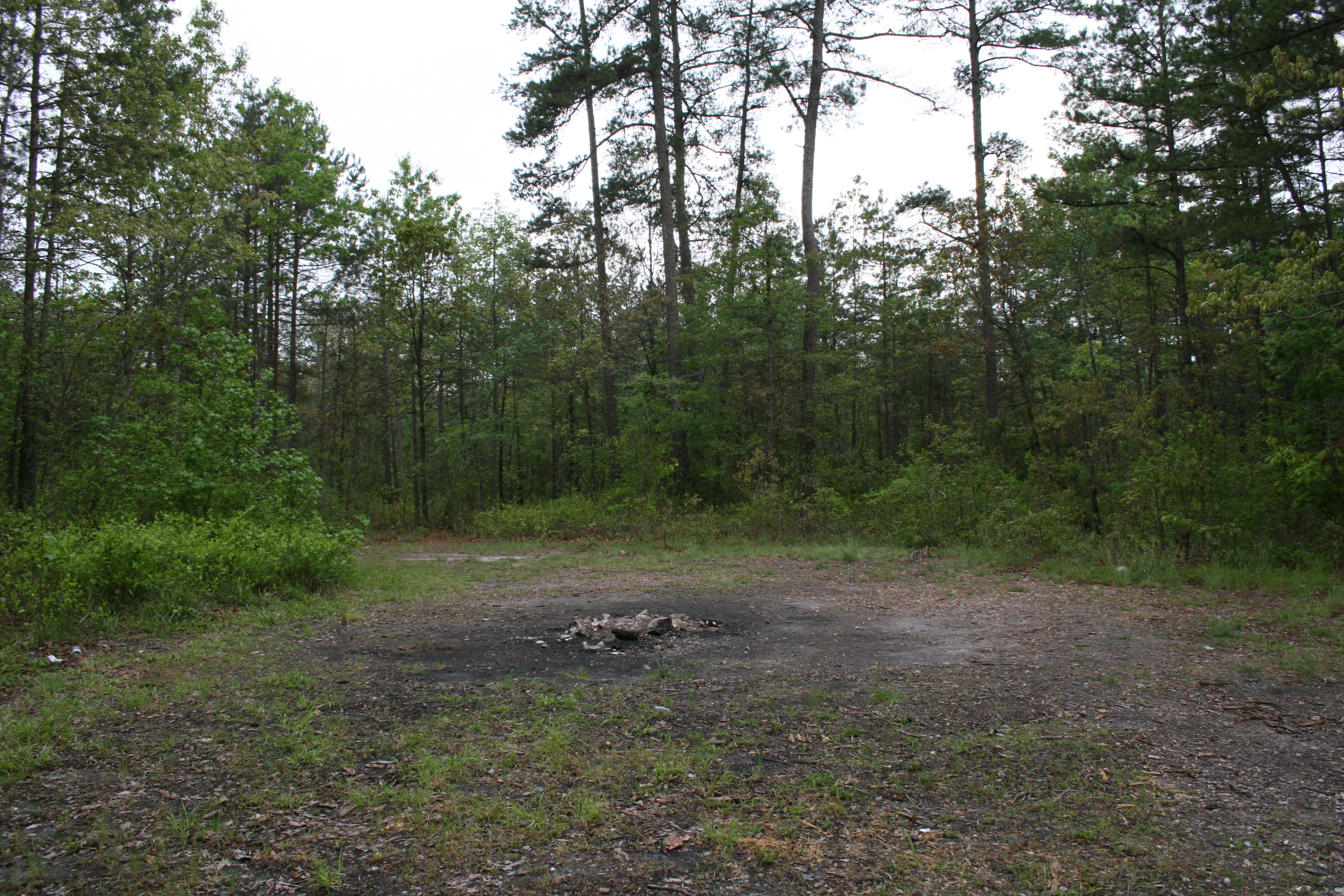
The Devil's Tramping Ground on May 5, 2007

The Devil's Tramping Ground (alternately Devil's Stomping Ground) is a camping spot located in a forest near the Harper's Crossroads area in Bear Creek, North Carolina. It has been the subject of persistent local legends and lore, which frequently allege that the Devil "tramps" and haunts a barren circle of ground in which nothing is supposed to grow. It has frequently been noted on lists of unusual place names.

== Lore ==
Legends about the ring are well known in local communities. These include the disappearance of objects left within the ring overnight, dogs yipping and howling, not wanting to go near it, and strange events occurring to those who spend the night within its boundaries. It has been alleged that nothing has grown within the 40 feet (12 m) ring for a hundred years. Supposedly it is where the devil walks in circles on certain nights, thinking of ways to bring his evil into this world.

John William Harden (1903–1985) of Greensboro, N.C., journalist, newspaper editor, author, and advisor to North Carolina governors and textile executives, had this to say of the Devil's Tramping Ground:

Chatham natives say... that the Devil goes there to walk in circles as he thinks up new means of causing trouble for humanity. There, sometimes during the dark of night, the Majesty of the Underworld of Evil silently tramps around that bare circle – thinking, plotting, and planning against good, in behalf of wrong.

== In popular culture ==
The Devil's Tramping Ground is mentioned in two horror novels by Poppy Z. Brite: Lost Souls and Drawing Blood. Both these novels take place, at least in part, in the fictional North Carolina city of Missing Mile, the inspiration for which is taken from Duncan and Chapel Hill, NC and Athens, GA.
