= Magdalena Solís =

Mexican cult leader and serial killer

- Born: 1947 (age 78–79); Tamaulipas, Mexico
- Died: Unknown
- Other name: "The High Priestess of Blood"
- Penalty: 50 years in prison

Details
- Victims: 2–15
- Span of crimes: March – May 1963
- Country: Mexico
- State: Tamaulipas

Magdalena Solís (1947 – date of death unknown), known as The High Priestess of Blood (Spanish: la Gran Sacerdotisa de la Sangre), allegedly was a Mexican serial killer and cult leader responsible for orchestrating several murders which involved the drinking of the victims' blood. The murders were committed in Yerbabuena, Tamaulipas, during the early 1960s.

Solís was convicted of two of the murders and sentenced to 50 years in prison; authorities ascribed eight murders to Solís and suspected she was involved in as many as 15. She is commonly regarded as one of the few documented instances of a sexually motivated female serial killer, showing organized, visionary, and hedonistic characteristics. However, the legitimacy of these claims are heavily disputed.

== Psychiatric profile ==
Magdalena Solís came from a poor and most likely dysfunctional family in Tamaulipas, where she was supposedly born in 1947. She is believed to have been working as a prostitute since an early age under her brother, a local pimp named Eleazar, before joining the Hernández Brothers' sect in 1963. After this, Solís developed a serious theological psychosis, causing her to experience major religiously oriented delusions of grandeur, coupled with a myriad of paraphilic disorders expressed in consuming the blood of her victims, sadomasochistic tendencies, fetishistic practices and pedophilia. Although confirmation of the blood being involved in rituals does exist, there is little evidence to support the claims of fetishism.

== The Hernández Brothers' sect ==
In late 1962 or early 1963, brothers Santos and Cayetano Hernández, working as petty scammers, travelled to the isolated community of Yerbabuena, an impoverished and mostly illiterate village of about 50 inhabitants. In a ploy for wealth, they proclaimed themselves as prophets of "the powerful and exiled Inca gods". They proclaimed that "the Inca gods, in exchange for worship and tributes, would grant them hidden treasures in the caves of the mountains surrounding the town (a place where they also performed their rites); and that they would soon come to claim authority over their ancient kingdom, and punish the non-believers."

Even though the Incas inhabited Peru and not Mexico, they convinced the inhabitants of Yerbabuena and founded a cult among the village, demanding economic and sexual tributes from adult members of all genders, ingesting drugs during orgies, and even selling some of their subordinates into sexual slavery.

Some time later, the believers grew skeptical when the brothers failed to fulfill their promises. To remedy this, the Hernándezes went to Monterrey in search of prostitutes to participate in the scam. Eventually, they met Magdalena Solís and her brother, who agreed to participate. They presented Solís in later rituals as the reincarnation of the goddess Cōātlīcue through a smoke screen trick and convinced the followers of her authenticity. Solís eventually came to believe that she truly was a reincarnated goddess and took command of the cult.

The story of the Hernández Brothers' starting the sect is disputed. There are few primary sources that back up the claim that the Hernández brothers started the cult. The Valley Evening Monitor, a Texan newspaper, from June 13, 1963, details that the cult was started by the twins, Magdalena Solís and her brother Eleazar Solís, and does not detail sexual activities of the cult. This is later confirmed by an interview in 1964 conducted by Bill Starr in which Inspector Gomez details how the twins set up the cult and went on to gradually lose control over the believers and the rituals.

== Crimes ==
By the time Solís took control, two of her followers, fed up with the sexual abuse, expressed their desire to leave. Fearing the repercussions, other members informed Solís and the Hernández brothers of this, with the former decreeing that the defectors be sacrificed. In response, fellow members lynched the two defectors.

=== Blood ritual ===
After these first two murders, Solís' violence and brutality gradually escalated. Bored with simple orgies, she demanded human sacrifices and devised a "blood ritual". All members of the cult brutally beat, burned, cut and mutilated their victim (who was always a dissenting member), before leaving them to bleed to death. They then deposited the blood in a chalice, mixed with chicken blood and narcotics (mostly marijuana or peyote), from which Solís drank before passing it along to the brothers and finally to other members. This supposedly gave them supernatural abilities, and at the end of the ritual, the victim's heart was ripped out.

Basing their beliefs of Aztec mythology, Solís and the Hernández brothers proclaimed that blood is the only food the gods can ingest, and that their goddess needed to drink it to preserve her eternal youth. The carnage lasted six continuous weeks, during which four people died and had their hearts extracted.

=== Last victims ===
One night in May 1963, a 14-year-old named Sebastián Guerrero wandered around the caves where the sect performed their rites. Investigating the noises and lights from one cave, he witnessed the cult killing a victim. He ran to the nearest police station, in the neighboring town of Villagrán, twenty-five kilometers away. Exhausted and in shock, Guerrero failed to give any other description than a "group of murderers, seized by ecstasy, gathered to drink human blood".

The officers did not believe him. On the following morning, one investigator, Luis Martínez, offered to escort Guerrero home and check where he had seen the "vampires". After their departure, Martínez never returned to work.

== Apprehension and conviction ==
Dismayed by the disappearance of both Guerrero and their colleague, the police contacted the army for assistance. On May 31, 1963, both police officers and soldiers conducted a joint crackdown in Yerbabuena, arresting Magdalena and Eleazar Solís at a farm in the town, where they were under the influence of marijuana. Santos Hernández would later be killed while resisting arrest, while his brother, Cayetano, had already been killed by a cult member, Jesús Rubio, who later claimed that he had wanted to take a part of the high priest's body to protect himself. Many of the cult members, who had barricaded themselves inside the cave, were killed in shootouts as well.

In subsequent investigations, the dismembered corpses of Sebastián Guerrero and Luis Martínez were found near the farm where the Solís siblings were residing, with Martínez's heart having been removed. In later searches, investigators found the mutilated corpses of six more people while examining the caves. For these two killings, both Magdalena and Eleazar were sentenced to 50 years imprisonment. Their guilt couldn't be proven in the other murders, since the surviving cult members refused to testify against them. As for the rest of the cult members, taking into account mitigating factors such as their illiteracy and impoverished circumstances, each was given a 30-year prison term. Years later, some of the former members began giving interviews about the cult.

== See also ==
- List of serial killers by country

== Bibliography ==
- Western Folklore. Western States Folklore Society. April 1964. p. 124.
- Brian Lane and Wilfred Gregg (January 1, 1994). The Encyclopedia of Serial Killers. Diamondis Communications. ISBN 1557739749.
- Brad Steiger (September 1, 2009). Real Vampires, Night Stalkers and Creatures from the Darkside. Visible Ink Press. ISBN 978-1578592869.
- Richard Glyn Jones (September 1, 2011). The Mammoth Book of Women Who Kill. Hachette UK. ISBN 978-1780333670.
- Don Rauf (December 15, 2015). Female Serial Killers. Enslow Publishing, LLC. ISBN 978-0766072886.
- Ricardo Ham (2016). Asesinos seriales mexicanos: Las entrañas de una realidad siniestra [Mexican Serial Killers: The Bowels of a Sinister Reality] (in Spanish). Penguin Random House. ISBN 978-6074809565.
