= Max Gufler =

Austrian serial killer

- Born: 1 May 1918
- Died: 9 August 1966 (aged 48); Stein Prison, Krems an der Donau, Austria
- Conviction: Murder
- Penalty: Life imprisonment

Details
- Victims: 4–18
- Span of crimes: 1946–1958
- Country: Austria
- Date apprehended: 1 November 1958

Max Gufler (1 May 1918 – 9 August 1966) was an Austrian serial killer who was convicted of killing four women. He was suspected of up to 18 murders. He was reportedly subject to outbursts of rage after being struck on the head with a rock at the age of nine. Gufler killed his victims after luring them with matrimonial advertisements.

== Early years ==
During Gufler's childhood, he was repeatedly haunted by unpredictable violence as a result of a serious skull injury, which he had suffered at the age of nine from an incident. During World War II, he was again injured as an ambulance driver of the Wehrmacht in frontline operations from shrapnel in his head area. His impaired physical and mental condition might be an explanation for his actions.

== Murders ==
After the Second World War, Gufler worked in the Lower Austrian town of St. Pölten as a bookseller until he met the daughter of a tobacconist in 1951. In his father-in-law's kiosk, he offered customers banned pornographic photos, eventually leading to his and the kiosk owner's detention.

Barely released from custody, Gufler killed prostitute Emilie Meystrzik, who was found in 1952 with a broken skull in a love hotel in the Viennese red-light district. Gufler, who now worked as a vacuum cleaner representative, developed into a cunning marriage swindler who promised marriage to women and killed them as soon as he had managed to obtain their money. He invited his victims to a honeymoon and then anaesthetised them with coffee spiked with barbituric acid. He drowned his unconscious victims in lakes to make the crime appear to be a suicide.

== Conviction ==
After the murder of Maria Robas in September 1958, the evidence against Gufler had accumulated. He was arrested in St. Pölten because of an urgent suspicion of having murdered 18 women since the end of the war. In order to be able to convict him, a new procedure was developed by Viennese forensic doctors at the time, with which two sleep aids could be separated and individually identified.

Although he was charged with seven murders, only four murders and two attempted murders were proven in a jury trial before the Vienna District Court for Criminal Matters. Despite his severe brain trauma, Gufler was sentenced to life imprisonment in May 1961. In 1966, he died at Stein Prison in Krems an der Donau.

== Literature ==
- Newton, Michael (2002). The Encyclopedia of Serial Killers. ISBN 3-85365-189-5.

== See also ==
- List of serial killers by number of victims
