= Rotherham shoe rapist =

British rapist

Rotherham shoe rapist is a media epithet given to convicted British serial rapist James Desmond Lloyd from Rotherham, a metropolitan borough of South Yorkshire, England. After attacking his victims, Lloyd stole their footwear and jewellery to keep as trophies. Lloyd was known to be active between 1983 and 1986 when his offending suddenly stopped. He was arrested in 2006 after a familial DNA profile linked him to the crimes. He pleaded guilty to four rapes and two attempted rapes, and was sentenced to fifteen years in prison.

== Crimes ==
Between 1983 and 1986 a man violently attacked and raped at least four lone women and attempted to assault at least two others in the Rotherham area. His victims were aged between 18 and 54 and were typically attacked during the early hours of the morning while returning from a night out. During the attacks the perpetrator carried stockings and tights to use as a mask and to tie up his victims. The offender always stole the shoes from his victims; he also often stole their jewellery and perfume.

While several suspects were identified and interviewed at the time, the case grew cold. The crimes were featured on the BBC Television programme Crimewatch, which prompted 350 names being provided to authorities. Lloyd was not among those named.

== Re-opening of investigation ==
Following advancements in genetic profiling and forensic science, South Yorkshire Police re-opened the case in 2001. Investigators produced a list of just over 40 individuals possibly related to the rapist, based on their DNA profiles. Police spoke to Lloyd's sister, who had provided a DNA sample after a prior drink-driving offence. After learning that the police were investigating him, Lloyd attempted to hang himself. He survived after he was found by his son.

At the time he came to the attention of the police, James Lloyd was a married father of two children living in the village of Thurnscoe, in South Yorkshire. He was a manager at Dearne Valley Printers, a printing firm in Wath upon Dearne. Police raided his home and the printing firm he managed and found over 100 pairs of women's shoes, both new and used, as well as hundreds of tights and stockings. Police also found a document titled "The Perfect Victim" which detailed identical crimes to the ones committed by Lloyd, although it was unclear if it was written by Lloyd.

== Arrest and conviction ==
In April 2006, Lloyd was arrested and charged. He pleaded guilty to four rapes and two attempted rapes in July 2006, but denied responsibility for one other rape. Lloyd was initially sentenced to life in prison with no possibility of parole for just under fifteen years. Lloyd successfully appealed against the severity of his sentence, with judges at the Court of Appeal reducing his minimum term to seven years and 263 days.

After Lloyd's conviction, Detective Inspector Angie Wright stated "Obviously he had a fetish. There may well be other victims who have not come forward and some of the shoes may belong to other victims which were stolen at the time. Some are brand new but we know he took some from his victims to keep as sort of trophies. Some of the victims were able to identify the shoes that had been taken." Police have stated they believe Lloyd may have had as many as 120 victims.

== Aftermath ==
Detective Inspector Sue Hickman was awarded first prize in the Crime Investigation category at the Airwave Police Professional Awards in 2007 for her work on the case.

The 2011 Peter James novel Dead Like You is based on the case. In an interview with the Telegraph, James said he was "instantly drawn" to the shoe rapist case as inspiration for a novel which would "explore the subject of rape from all perspectives, from that of the perpetrator, the victim and the police."

An episode of the CBS Reality series Written in Blood aired in 2017 explores the crime and the efforts to bring Lloyd to justice.

Lloyd was released in 2014.

== See also ==
- House for sale rapist – an unidentified UK serial rapist who has been at large since 1979. Suspected to be John Cannan

Other (active) UK cold cases where the offender's DNA is known:

- Batman rapist – subject to Britain's longest-running serial rape investigation
- Murder of Deborah Linsley
- Murders of Eve Stratford and Lynne Weedon
- Murders of Jacqueline Ansell-Lamb and Barbara Mayo
- Murder of Lindsay Rimer
- Murder of Lyn Bryant
- Murder of Janet Brown
- Murder of Linda Cook
- Murder of Melanie Hall
