= Teresita Basa =

Murder victim (died 1977)

Teresita Basa was a Filipino respiratory therapist who gained posthumous attention for the unusual circumstances surrounding her murder and its investigation. Her case has been featured in multiple true crime series and podcast, including Morbid: A True Crime Podcast (Episode 477), Unsolved Mysteries and Voice from the Grave.

== Death and investigation ==
On February 21, 1977, Basa was murdered in her apartment in Lincoln Park, Chicago, after finishing her shift at Edgewater Hospital. After returning home, she had dinner and spoke with a friend by phone in two calls: the first around 7:10 pm, discussing the sale of tickets, and the second around 7:30 pm, with Ruth Loeb. The first call lasted approximately 20 minutes, during which Basa mentioned that she was expecting a male visitor.

Neighbors late noticed the smell of smoke coming from her apartment and alerted the janitor, who called 911. Firefighters responded around 8:40 pm to her unit on the 15th floor of 2740 N. Pine Grove Ave. Basa was found mortally wounded, stripped naked, with a butcher knife plunged into her chest. Her clothes were scattered over her body, and the mattress had been set on fire. Initial speculation suggested a sexual assault, but the autopsy later ruled this out.

Police interviewed co-workers, friends and family members, who reported no known enemies or threats. Despite these efforts, the investigation stalled due to a lack of leads.

== Psychic testimony ==
In August 1977, approximately six months after Basa's death, co-worker Remy Chua reportedly became possessed by Basa's spirit, according to Chua's husband. During a trance state, speaking in Tagalog, she allegedly said:

"Doctor, I would like to ask for your help. The man who murdered me is still at large".

When asked who the spirit was, she responded:

"I am Teresita Basa".

Following this account, police investigators Joseph Stachula and Lee Epplen, along with Dr. Jose Chua (Remy's husband), were contacted. The spirit allegedly identified Alan Showery as the suspect. Detectives recalled a note found in Basa’s room reading, "Get theatre tickets for A.S." Background checks confirmed Showery was employed at Edgewater Hospital.

== The trial ==
The trial received extensive media coverage. On October 2, 1978, Showery appeared in court, represented by attorneys Swano and Radakovich. Later, a 27-year-old Karen Thompson, the sister of Governor James Thompson, joined the defense team. The arraignment was held on January 10, 1979, before Chief Judge Richard J. Fitzgerald. Television reporters covered the proceedings, which came to be known as the "voice from the grave" trial.
