= Copper Queen Hotel =

Historic hotel in Cochise County, Arizona

Coordinates: 31.4424°N 109.9143°W

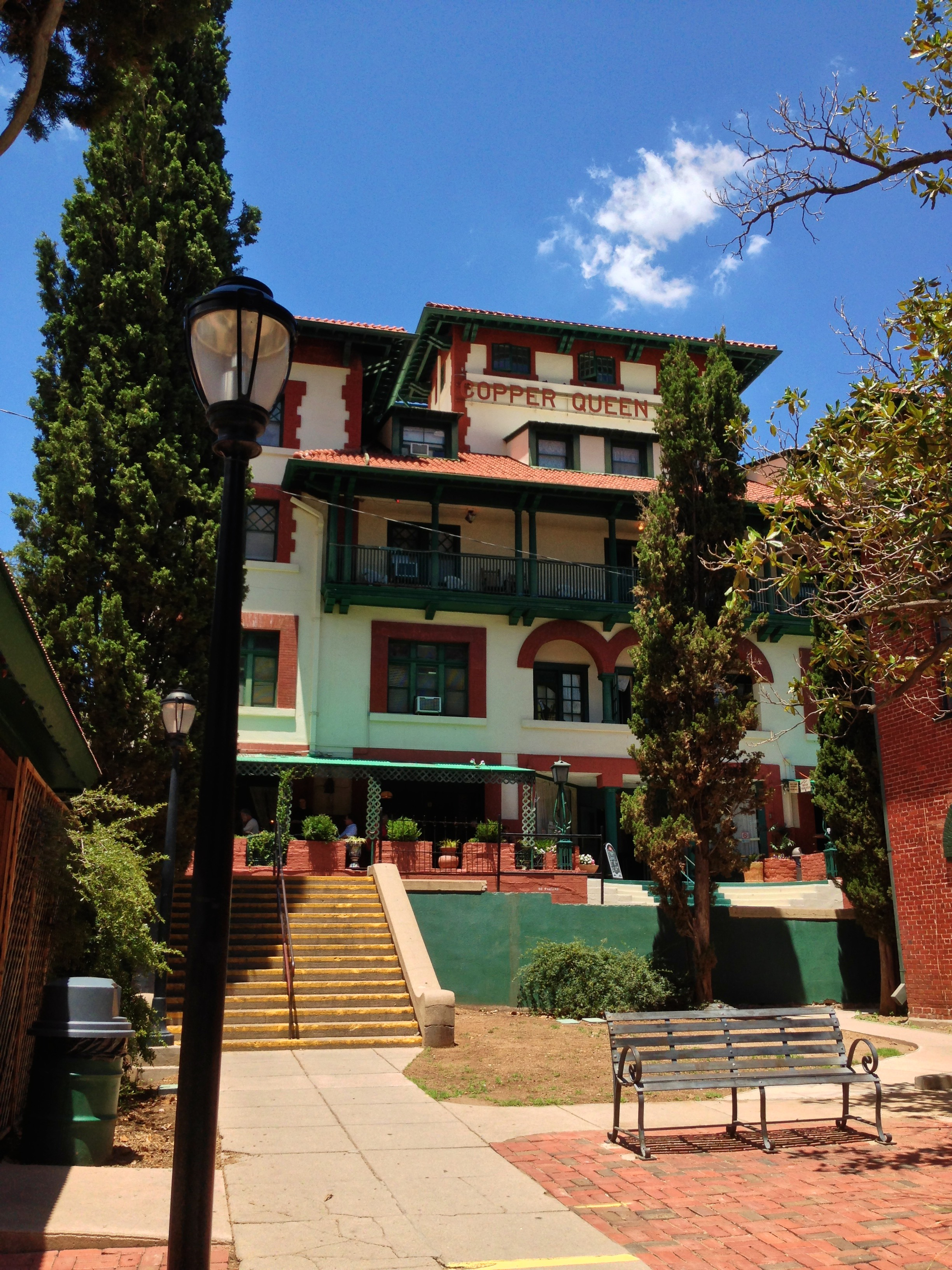
A view of the front of the Copper Queen Hotel in Bisbee, AZ

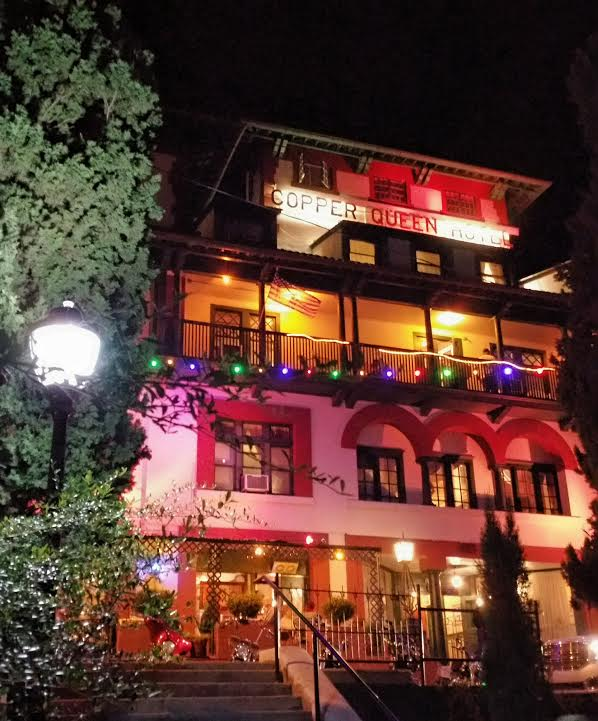
Copper Queen Hotel at night

The Copper Queen Hotel is a historic hotel located in Bisbee, Arizona.

Holding the distinction of being Arizona's longest continuously operated hotel, the Copper Queen was constructed from 1898 to 1902 by the Phelps Dodge Corporation to serve as lodging for investors and dignitaries visiting its nearby copper mine.

== Television ==
The hotel was the subject of an episode of the Travel Channel show Resort Rescue. The episode featured a drunken streaker running around the hotel at midday.
