= Harvard Exit Theatre =

Coordinates: 47°37′30″N 122°19′18″W

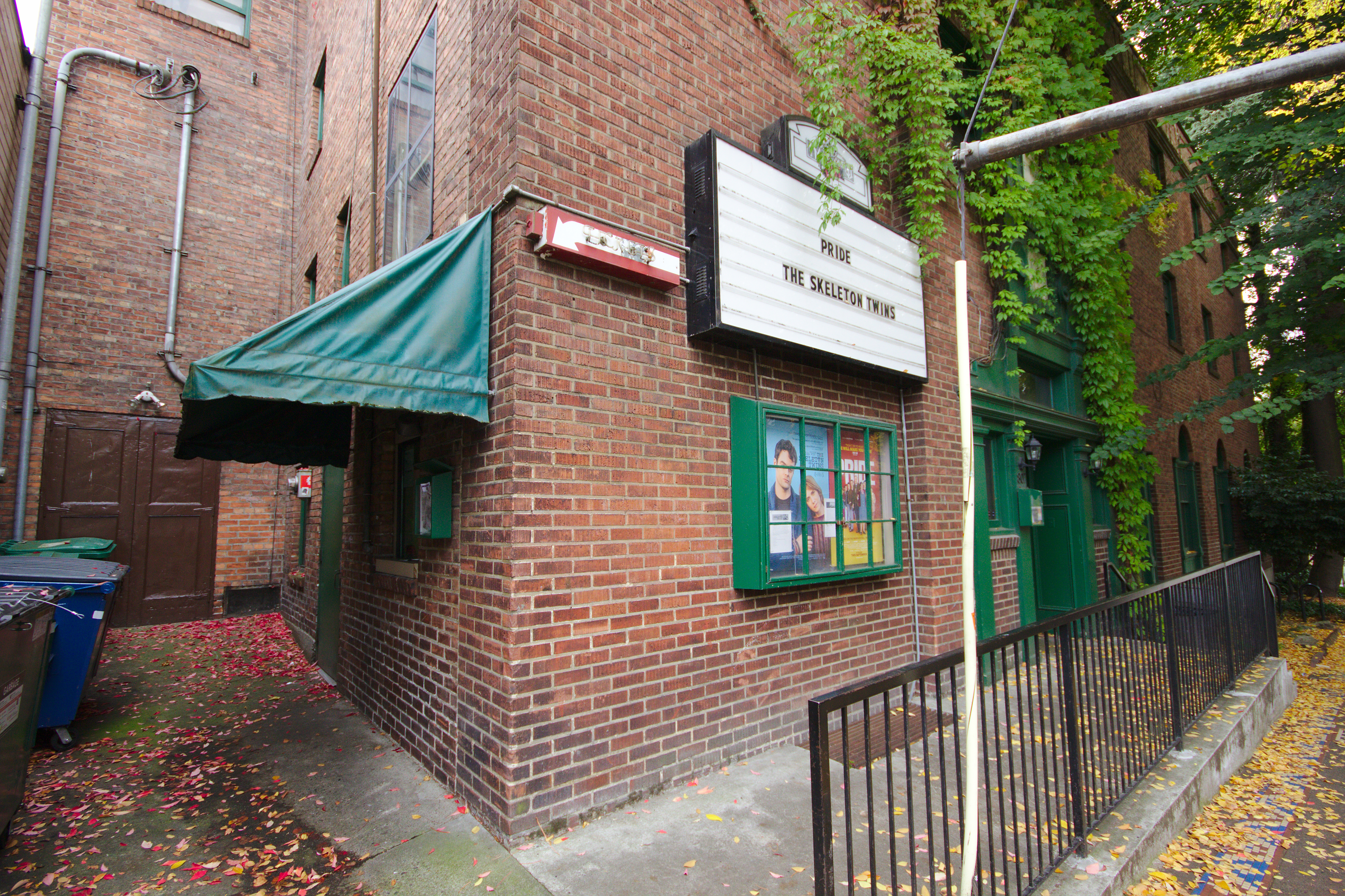
Box office and entrance of Harvard Exit Theatre

The Harvard Exit Theatre was a cinema located in Seattle, Washington. It was housed in a building built in 1925 by the Womans Century Club, which still meets there at midday on the third Friday of the month. The building was sold in 1968 on the condition that the lobby not be altered, which it has not been to this day. It was converted into a cinema by Jim Osteen and Art Bernstein, Its "grand-opening preview" as a cinema occurred May 20, 1969, with regularly scheduled films beginning the following day.

Reports began to surface that the building was haunted by a woman in 1920s garb. However, reports ceased in 1987. The theatre was owned by O'Steen & Harvard Investments and operated by Landmark Theaters until 2015, when developer Scott Shapiro purchased the building for conversion to an office and restaurant space. The Consulate of Mexico leased space in the building; the consulate opened circa July 2018.
