= Jennifer Pan =

American political scientist

- Education: Princeton University (BA); Harvard University (PhD)
- Occupation: Political scientist
- Employer: Stanford University

Jennifer Pan is an American political scientist currently serving as professor of communication at Stanford University, where she is also a senior fellow at the Freeman Spogli Institute for International Studies and holds a courtesy appointment as a professor of political science. Her book Welfare for Autocrats: How Social Assistance in China Cares for its Rulers discusses the guaranteed minimum income system in China.

== Education ==
Pan received her Ph.D. in 2015 from Harvard University's Department of Government. She graduated with a B.A. from Princeton University's School of Public and International Affairs in 2004.

== Publications ==
=== Books ===
- Pan, Jennifer, Welfare for Autocrats: How Social Assistance in China Cares for its Rulers, Oxford University Press, 2020

=== Articles ===
- G King, J Pan, ME Roberts, "How censorship in China allows government criticism but silences collective expression", American Political Science Review 107 (2), 2013, 326–343
- G King, J Pan, ME Roberts, "How the Chinese government fabricates social media posts for strategic distraction, not engaged argument", American Political Science Review 111 (3), 2017, 484–501
- G King, J Pan, ME Roberts, "Reverse-engineering censorship in China: Randomized experimentation and participant observation", Science 345 (6199), 2014, 1251722
- J Chen, J Pan, Y Xu, "Sources of authoritarian responsiveness: A field experiment in China", American Journal of Political Science 60 (2), 2016, 383–400
- J Pan, Y Xu, "China’s ideological spectrum" The Journal of Politics 80 (1), 2018, 254–273
