= The Cheltenham Ghost =

Ghost apparition in Cheltenham, United Kingdom

The Cheltenham Ghost was an apparition said to haunt a house in Cheltenham in western England. The building in Pittville Circus Road was the home of the Despard family who saw the ghost of a veiled woman on several occasions in the 1880s.

The Society for Psychical Research in London is the oldest institute of its kind in the world. Its members are dedicated to researching purportedly paranormal phenomena. To this end, Frederic Myers an SPR Council member whose mother was resident in the town decided to investigate the case. He produced perhaps one of the first reports on a ghost apparition investigation in history. His contribution was largely by publishing the account of Rosina Despard (under the pseudonym 'Rose Morton') a young woman resident in the house. Myers own investigations were limited to interviewing residents, locals and former servants.

== Summary ==
In April 1882, Captain Despard with his invalid wife and six children moved into a house then known as 'Donore' in Cheltenham, England. The house, formerly 'Garden Reach', had been empty for many years, and there were reports of its being haunted.

It was in June that Rosina, the Captain's daughter, saw the ghost for the first time:

"The figure was that of a tall lady, dressed in black of a soft woollen material, judging from the slight sound in moving. The face was hidden in a handkerchief held in the right hand (...)on further occasions, when I was able to observe her more closely, I saw the upper part of the left side of the forehead, and a little of the hair above. Her left hand was nearly hidden by her sleeve and a fold of her dress. As she held it down a portion of a widow's cuff was visible on both wrists, so that the whole impression was that of a lady in widow's weeds".

The ghost was seen on a number of occasions between 1882 and 1886 by several people, some of whom also claimed to hear the woman's footsteps. All 17 people who saw it say it was so lifelike that at first, they mistook it for a living person.

== Frederic Myers Investigation ==
Frederic Myers researched the history of the house and (mistakenly) found that 'Donore' was built in 1860 (actually 1864/65) and occupied by a husband and wife Elizabeth and Henry Swinhoe.

After Elizabeth's death, Henry married again. Henry and his new wife Imogen were heavy drinkers and did not have a good relationship, and Henry Swinhoe himself was taken to court after drunkenly trying to upset a pram that carried the baby Gustav Holst. The second wife, Imogen left the house shortly before the husband died, in 1876 and died shortly afterwards herself in 1878 in Clifton, Bristol. By obtaining pictures of both women, Frederic Myers was able to allow Rosina to "identify" the ghost as the second wife of the previous owner, Imagen Swinhoe.

Rosina Despard was in her late teens at the time of the alleged hauntings; she went on to become the twenty third woman to graduate with a medical degree in England, and to become the physician at Holloway women's prison.

== Subsequent Research ==
Seventeen people claim to have seen the ghost and it was assumed that it was no longer seen after 1899. Later, after the house was turned into a boarding school for boys, there were stories of a lady being encountered in the corridors, in the stairs and in the gardens. It subsequently became known as St. Anne's and was used as a diocesan House for the diocese of Gloucester, and MacKenzie reports one unusual report from that period.

In 1958 Society for Psychical Research President G.W. Lambert suggested a naturalistic explanation for the case; suggesting that underground water caused subsidence and led to the family misinterpreting mundane sounds as ghostly, hence predisposing them to hallucinate the apparition. His argument was that changes in the water table caused by the opening of the nearby Dowdeswell Reservoir led to the apparition ceasing.

Andrew MacKenzie, an occult and crime writer who was also a member of the Society for Psychical Research, wrote a book, Hauntings and Apparitions: An Investigation of the Evidence, in which he claims that three people have seen figures around Garden Reach between 1958 and 1961.

In 1977 ghost hunter Peter Underwood proposed another mundane explanation; that the ghost was in fact a real physical woman, Captain Despard's mistress, and this was the reason she always concealed her face. According to Underwood's hypothesis the family Rosina and others misled Myers to prevent a scandal.

In 2021 Association for the Scientific Study of Anomalous Phenomena chair Christian Jensen Romer published a paper looking at contemporary records. He found that there was a peculiar incident during the Swinhoe's residence when a maidservant dressed as a ghost as fancy dress for Bonfire Night was attacked by a frightened errand boy and speculates that memories of this incident and the magistrate's court case could have led to the house mistakenly acquiring a reputation as haunted. He also notes that Myer's investigation was minimal, but that the sources give us no reason to disbelieve Rosina's account.

However Jensen Romer establishes that the name "The Cheltenham Ghost" originally applied to another purported haunting in Suffolk Street off the Bath Road, that reached the international press after local railway companies laid on special "ghost hunting trains" to allow the curious to come and see the mysterious lights. This and another case referenced by the sceptical magician John Nevil Maskelyne (as occurring in his own home in Swindon Road, Cheltenham) both share an apparition with the characteristics of being an older woman looking for lost money or hidden treasure, suggesting this was a common folk belief in the town at the time.
