= Winchester Mystery House =

Mansion in San Jose, California

- U.S. National Register of Historic Places
- California Historical Landmark
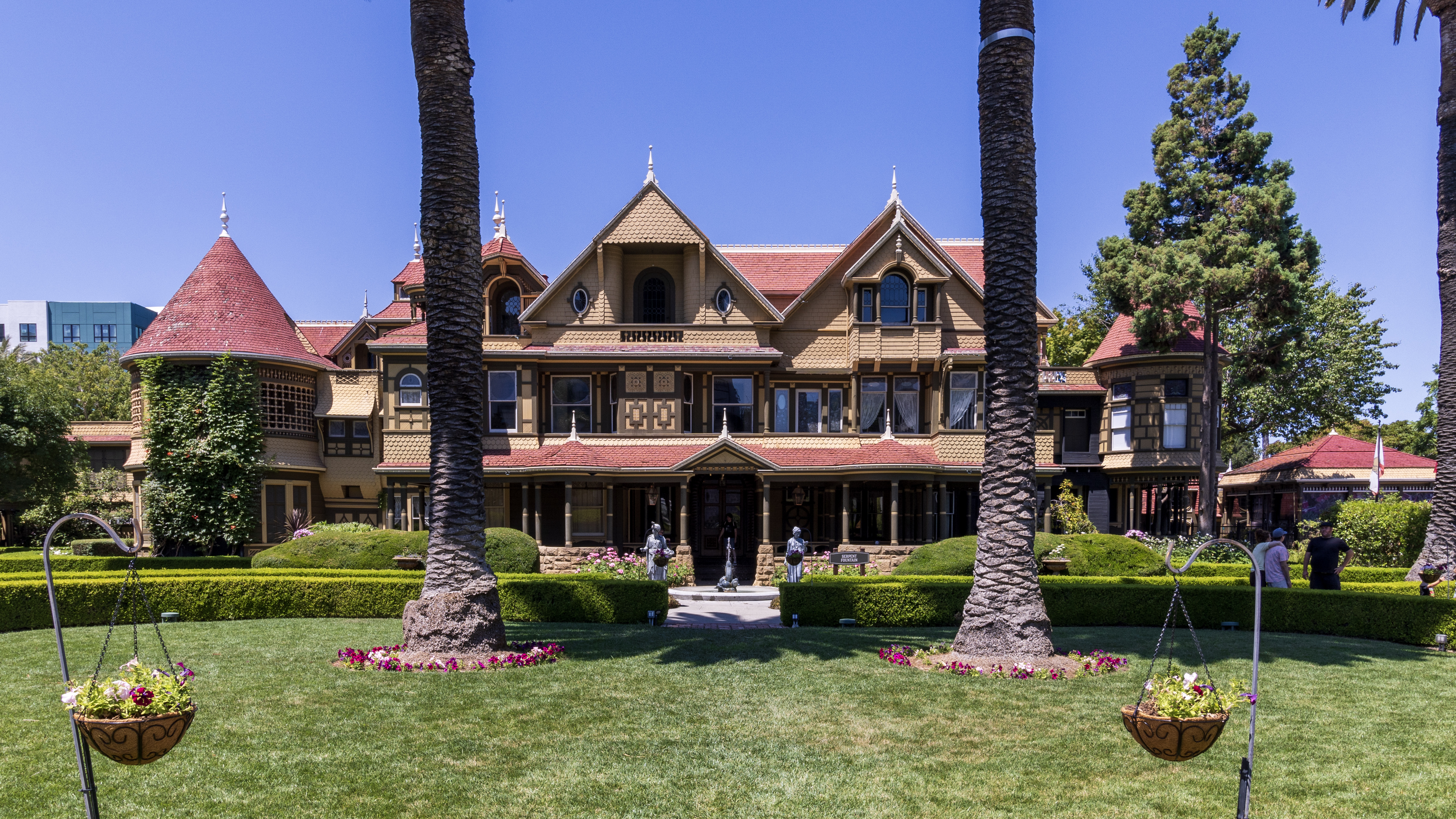
- View of the mansion from the east

- Location within San Jose, California Location within California Location within the United States
- Location: 525 South Winchester Boulevard San Jose, CA 95128
- Coordinates: 37°19′6.10″N 121°57′2.74″W
- Built: 1884–1906
- Architectural style: Victorian, Gothic
- Website: winchestermysteryhouse.com
- NRHP reference No.: 74000559
- CHISL No.: 868

Significant dates
- Added to NRHP: August 7, 1974
- Designated CHISL: 1925

The Winchester Mystery House is a mansion in San Jose, California, that was once the personal residence of Sarah Winchester, the widow of firearms magnate William Wirt Winchester. The house became a tourist attraction nine months after her death in 1922. The Victorian and Gothic-style mansion is renowned for its size and its architectural curiosities and for the numerous myths and legends surrounding the structure and its former owner.

== Sarah Winchester ==
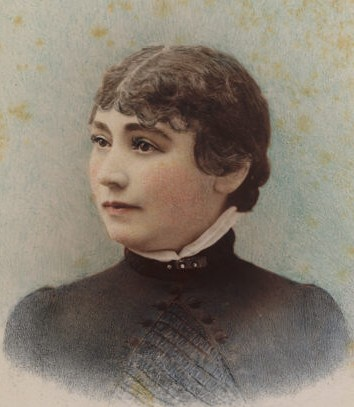
Sarah Winchester, 1865

Sarah Winchester was born in 1839 in New Haven, Connecticut. She was called Sallie by people closest to her, after her paternal grandmother. She married William Wirt Winchester in 1862.

In 1866, Winchester gave birth to a girl named Annie Pardee Winchester. Diagnosed with marasmus, she did not thrive and lived only a month. Between the fall of 1880 and the spring of 1881, Winchester's mother, father-in-law, and husband died. She was left with a large inheritance from her husband. In 1884, her eldest sister, Mary Converse, died.

Around this time, Winchester began developing rheumatoid arthritis. Her doctor suggested that a warmer and drier climate might help improve her health. In 1885, at the age of 46, Winchester moved to California from New Haven, Connecticut. According to Mary Jo Ignoffo in her book Captive of the Labyrinth: Sarah L. Winchester, Heiress to the Rifle Fortune, her doctor's recommendation, her happy memories of traveling to San Francisco with her husband in the 1870s, and advertising about the weather and health benefits of California were possible factors in Winchester's decision to move. Winchester invited her three remaining sisters to follow her to California, which they did.

In 1886, Edward "Ned" Rambo, a San Francisco agent for the Winchester Repeating Arms Company, took Winchester on a tour of the Santa Clara valley to look for a home. He showed her a 45-acre ranch for sale located near San Jose. Winchester purchased the property (from John Hamm) which included a two-story, eight-room farmhouse. Since the property reminded her of Llanada Alavesa from the Basque area, she named her new home Llanada Villa.

In 1890, Winchester's 21-year-old niece, Marion Merriman (called Daisy) came to live with her. Merriman became Winchester's personal secretary, looking after business correspondence and banking. They attended charitable events together and were paying members of Associated Charities and the Red Cross.

In 1903, Winchester paid for Merriman's wedding to Frederick Marriott III. That same year, Winchester purchased several homes and properties in Atherton. One of the homes was offered to the newlyweds to live in, which they accepted. Winchester subsequently purchased a home for the couple closer to the train station for Frederick to travel to work from.

In 1904, Winchester purchased a large property near the hamlet of Burlingame, north of Coyote Point, then bought a houseboat, or ark as they were called at the time, instead of building a house.

Winchester died September 7, 1922, at age 83.

== San Jose house renovation ==
Winchester and her husband had developed an interest in architecture and interior design while building a home on Prospect Hill in New Haven. With plans to expand the farmhouse, Winchester hired at least two architects, but dismissed them, deciding to do the planning herself. She designed the rooms one by one, supervised the project, and sought advice from the carpenters she hired. She took inspiration for the house from the world's fairs that were common at the time. While the home was similar in scope to other homes of that period, it was unusual for a woman to look after such a project and, Colin Dickey states in his book Ghostland: an American History in Haunted Places, she could be considered an architectural pioneer of her time.

She was known to rebuild and abandon construction if the progress did not meet her expectations, which resulted in a maze-like design. In the San Jose News of 1897, it was reported that a seven-story tower was torn down and rebuilt 16 times. As a result of her expansions, there are walled-off exterior windows and doors that were not removed as the house grew in size. Multiple levels, up to five, were added to different parts of the home. The design was essentially Victorian, with elements of Gothic and Romanesque features.

=== Features of the house ===
There was carved wood on the ballroom walls and ceilings. Woods such as teak, maple, and mahogany made an intricate pattern on the ballroom floor. A large brick fireplace was framed by two windows that included quotes from Shakespeare. The second-floor bedrooms each had adjoining sitting rooms and sewing rooms. The wall coverings (known as Lincrusta) had a leather or metal appearance. The ceilings had mouldings, stencils, and faux finishes. There were chandeliers from Germany, art glass from Austria, furnishings from Asia, and paintings from France. An annunciator (an early form of intercom, a common feature of large homes during this period) was installed for calling servants. There was an indoor garden with slanted floors that would carry excess water to trapdoors; the doors had pipes to supply water to flowers outdoors. A generator was installed for a water pump and electricity. Because of Winchester's height of four feet ten inches and her health issues, a stairway was built that has 44 steps but rises only ten feet.

Interior details of the Winchester Mystery House
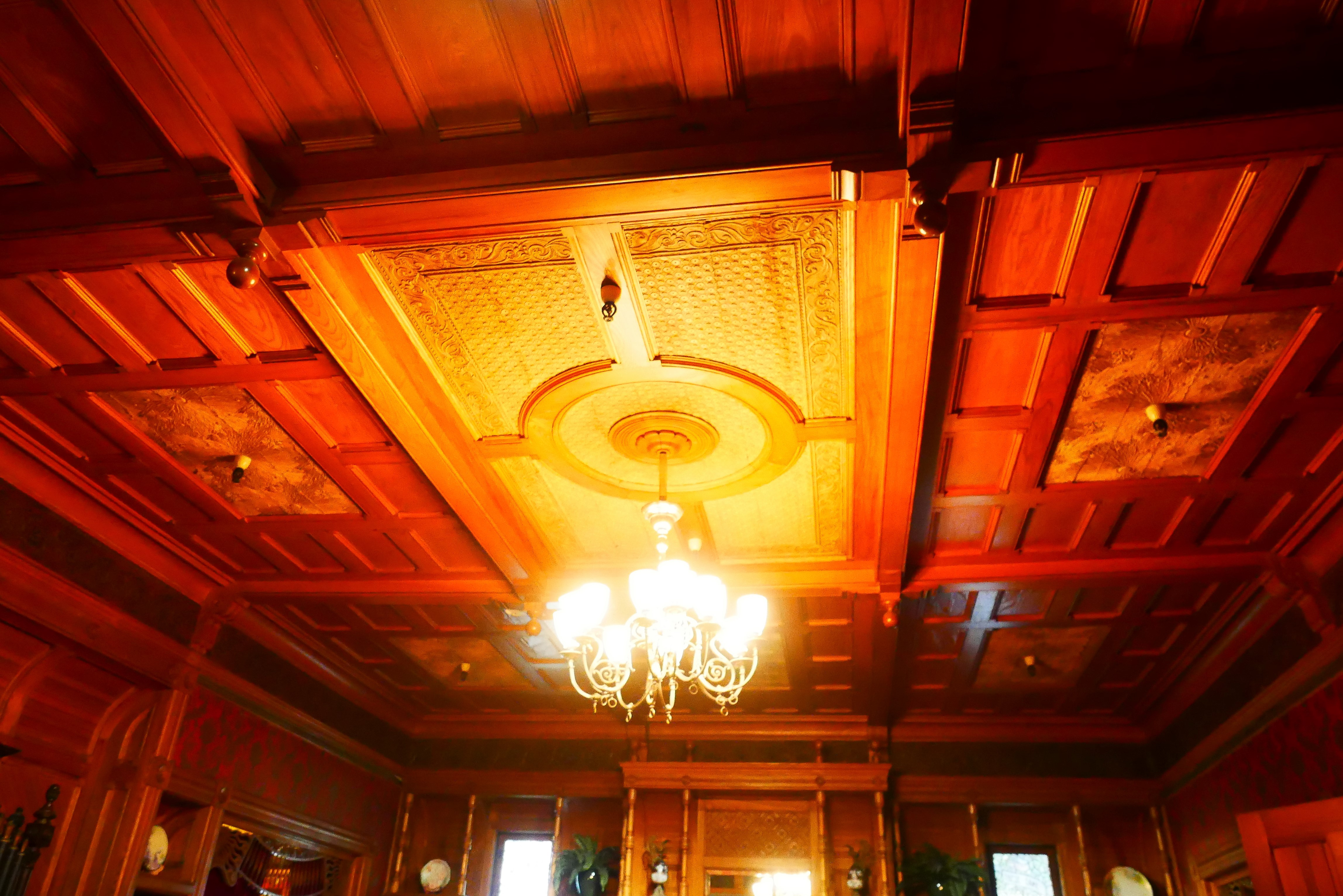
Wood Ceiling

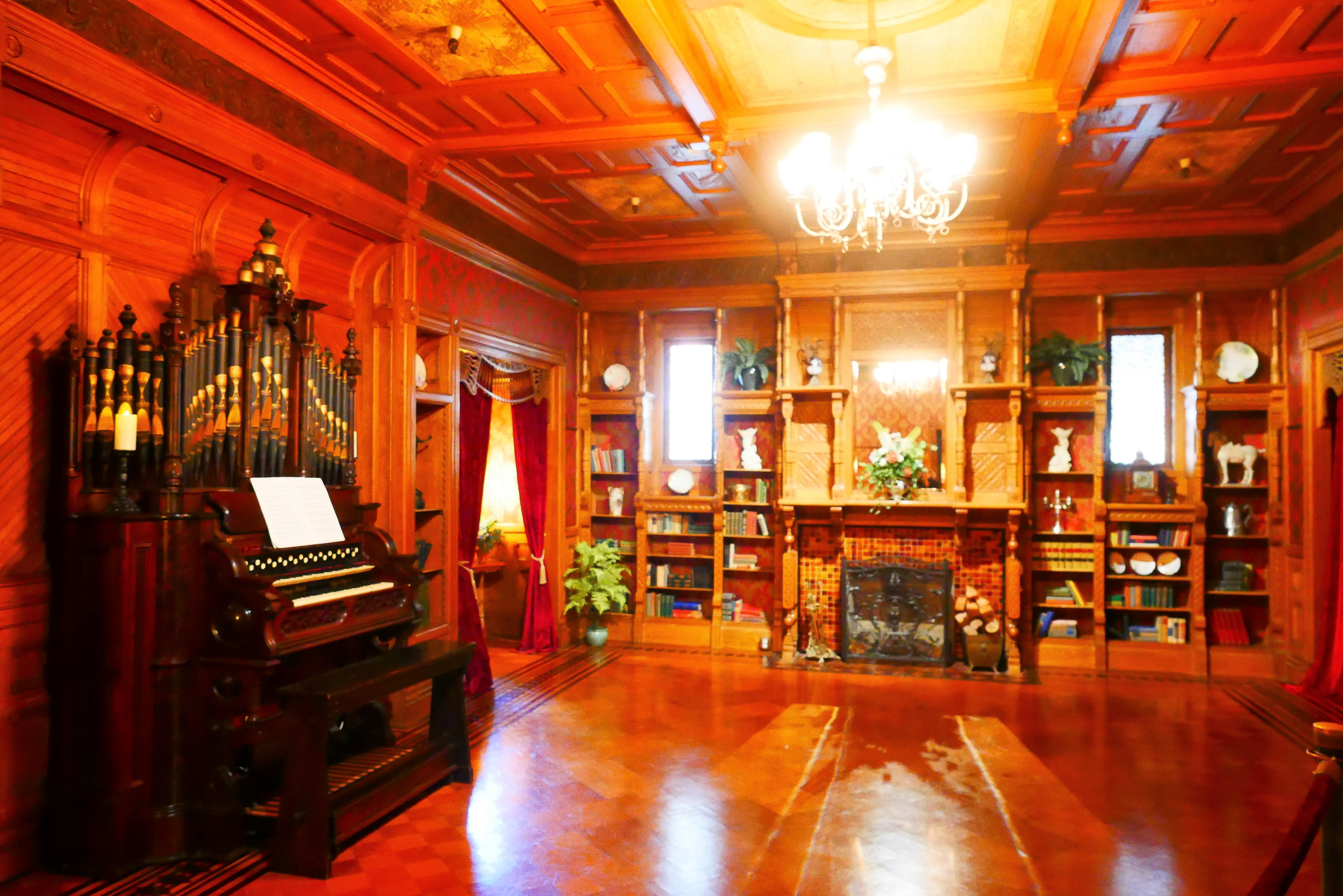
Organ, fireplace, and windows with Shakespeare quotations

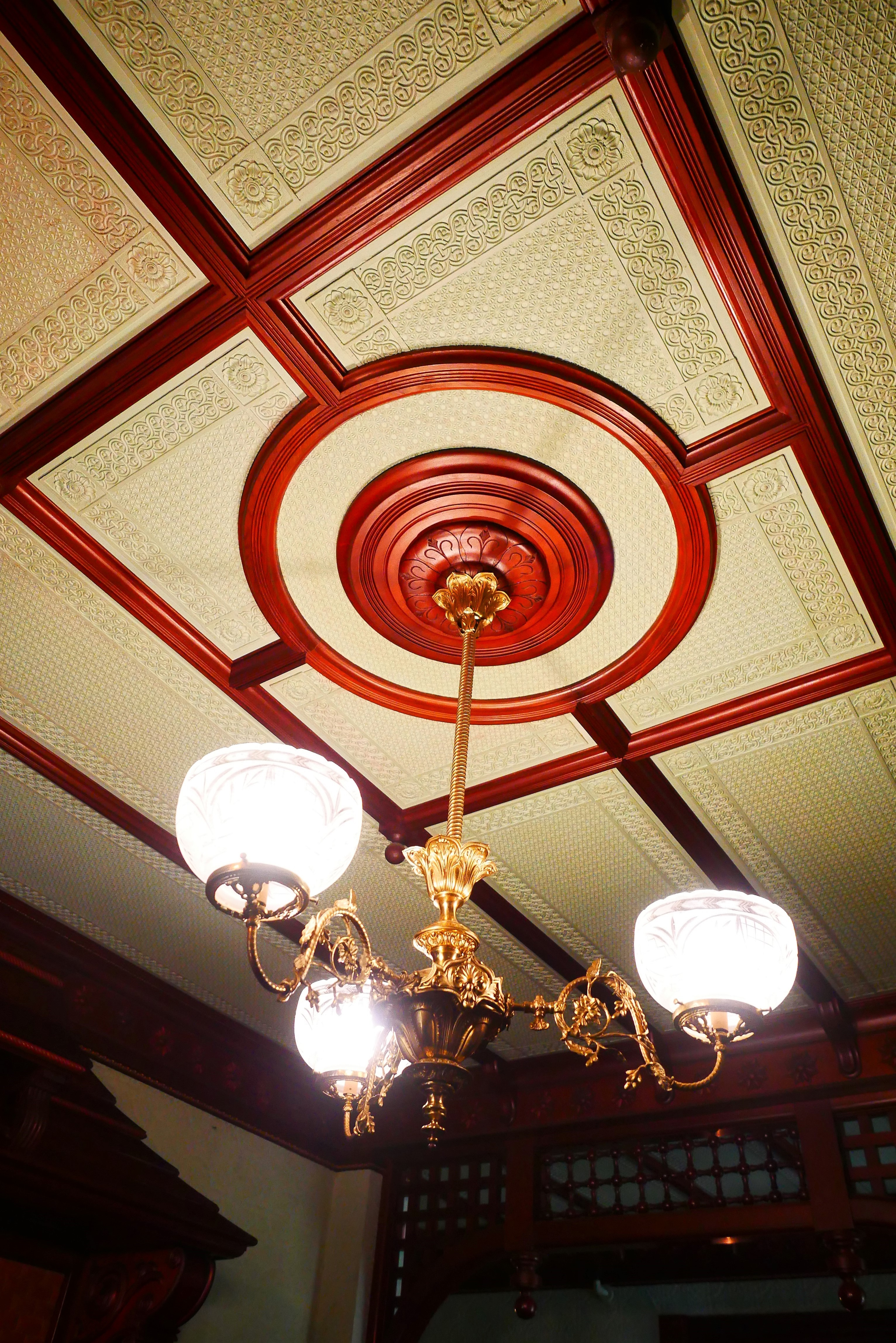
Mouldings

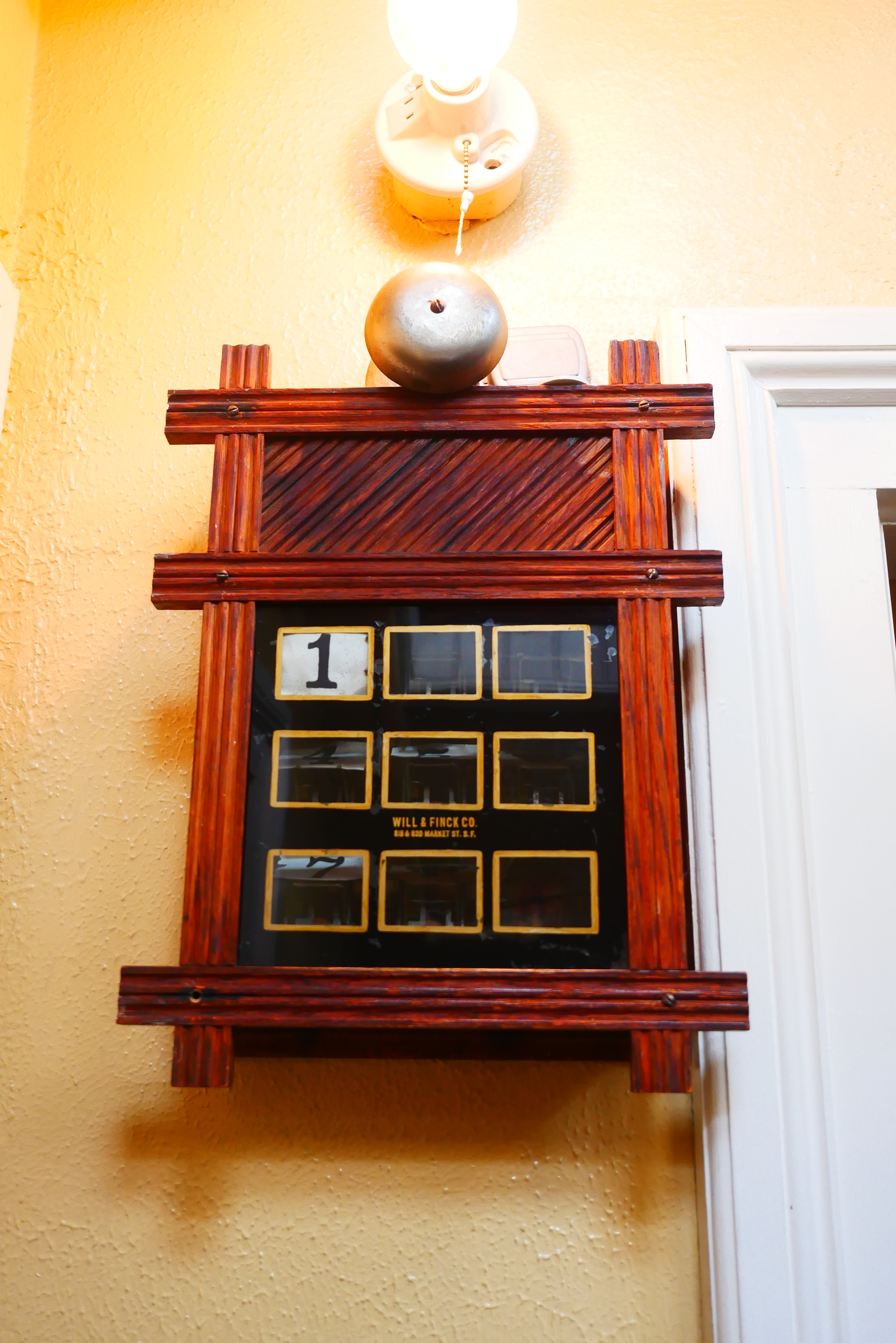
Annunciator intercom

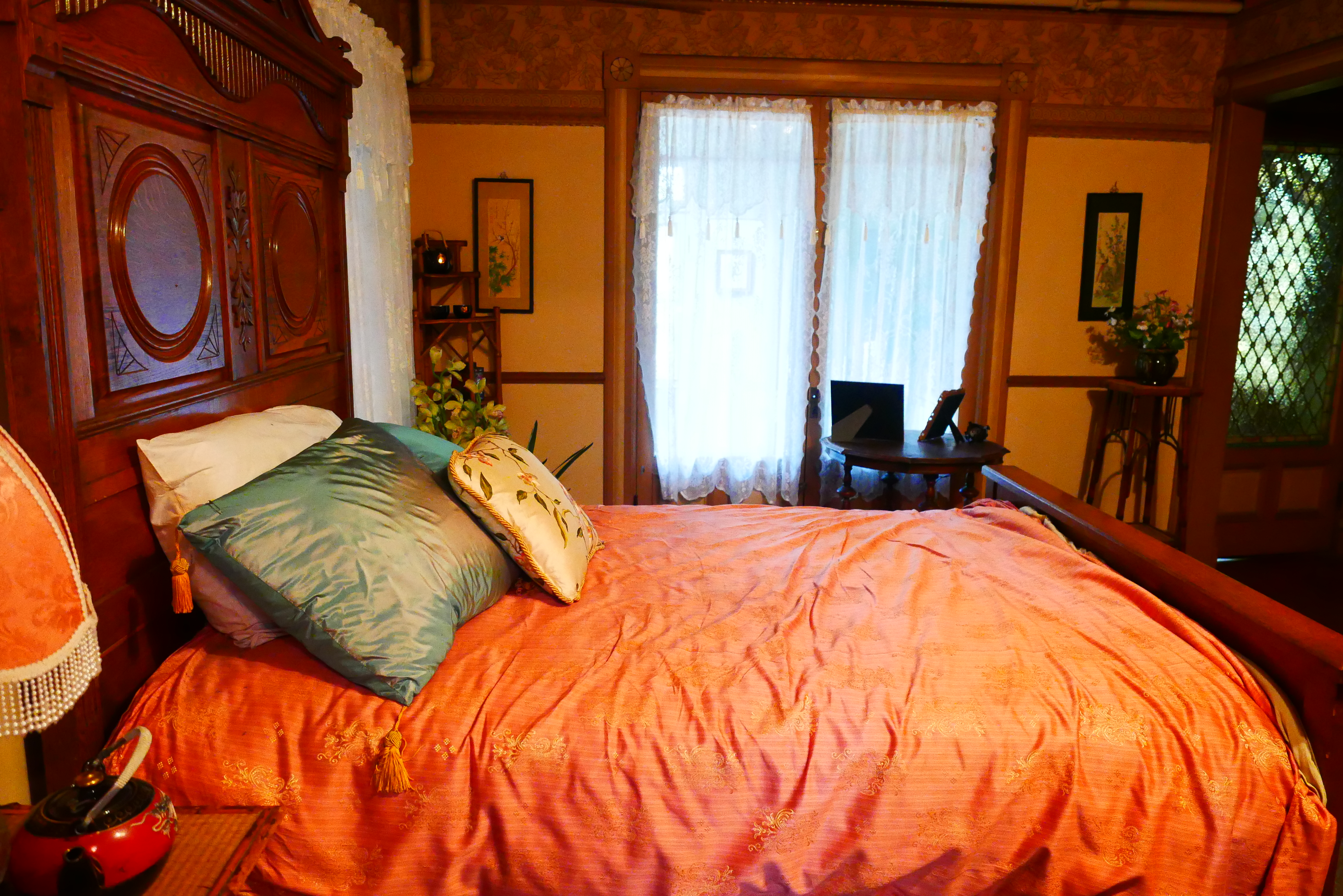
Orange bedroom

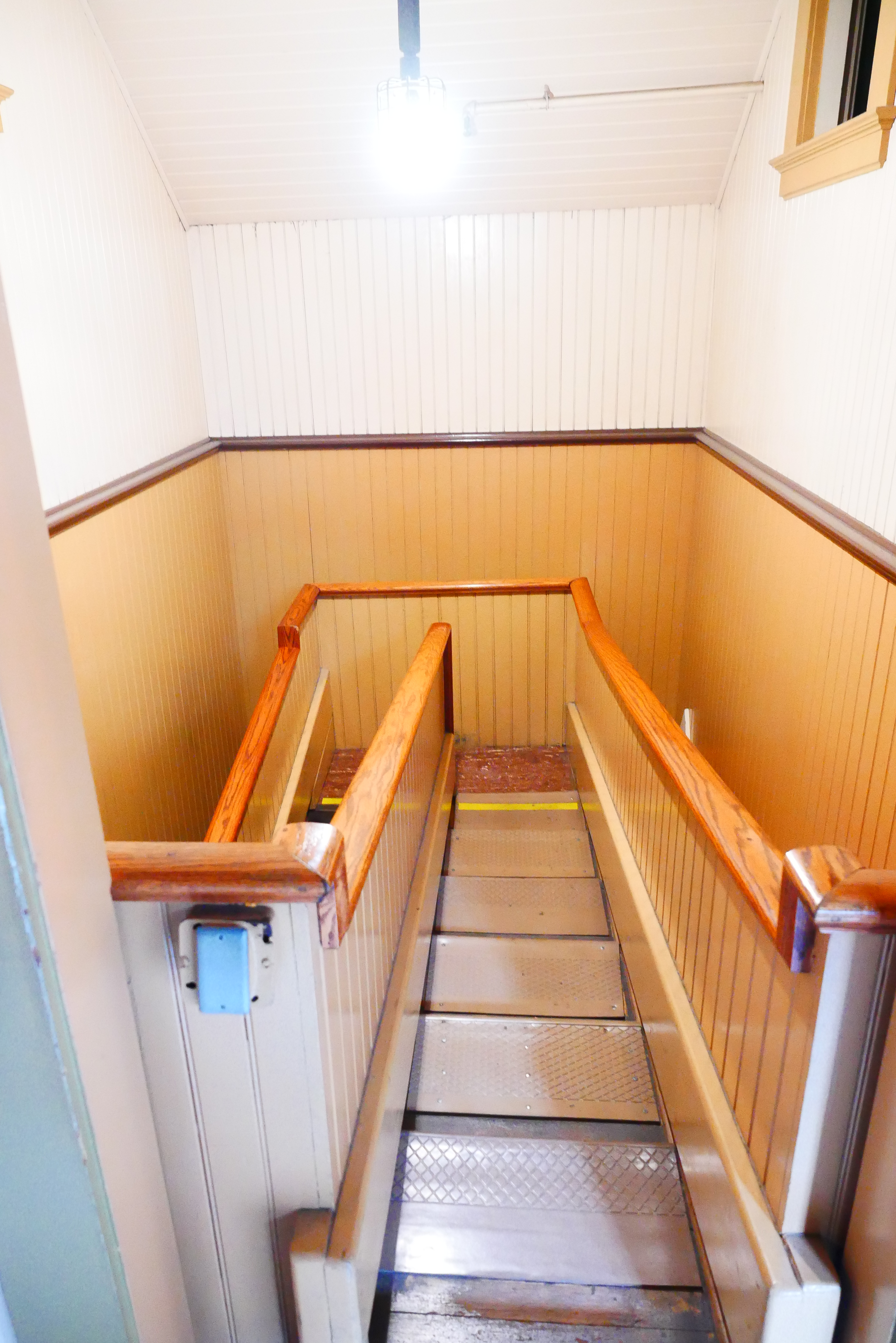
44 stairs that rise ten feet

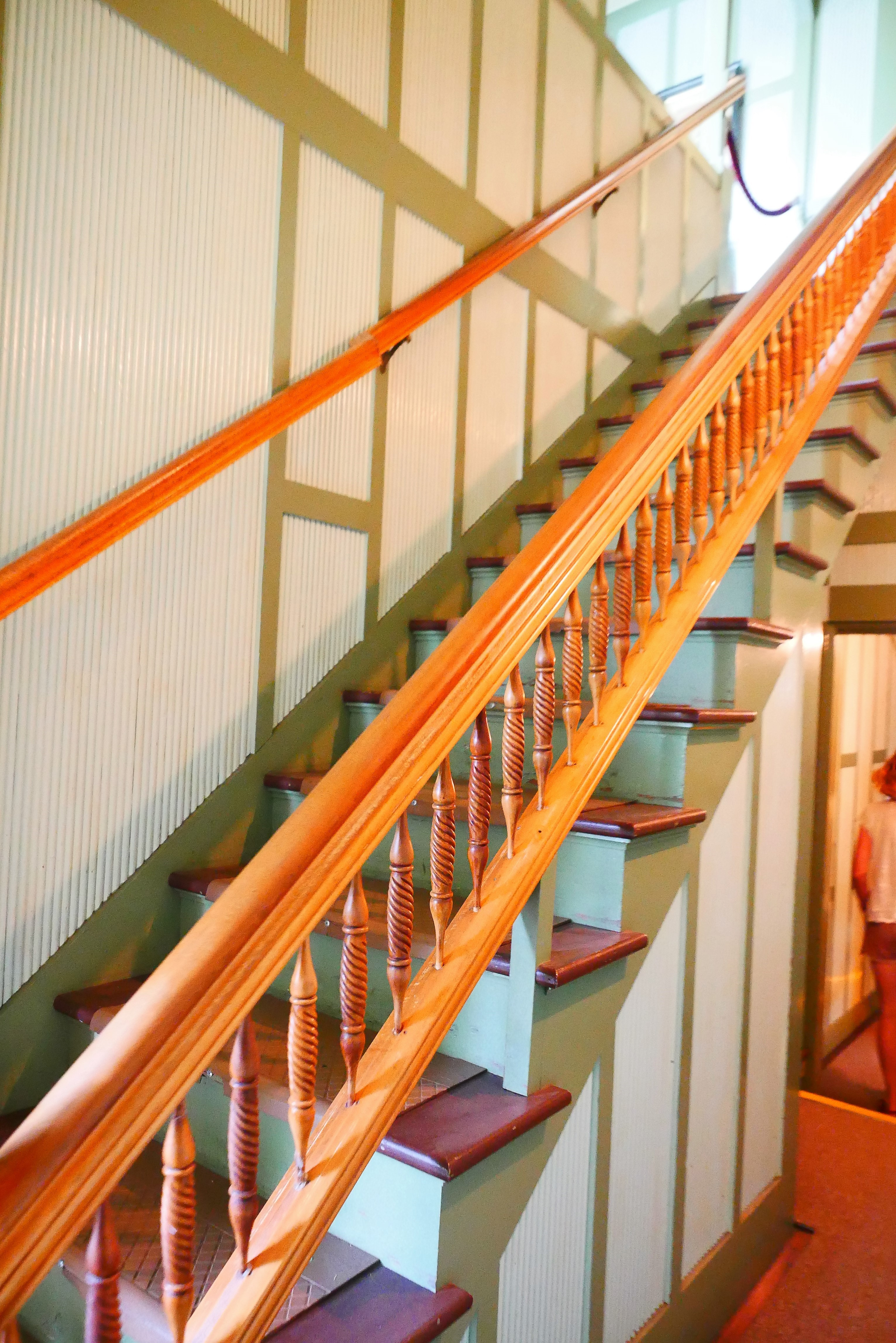
Stairway

The windows are unusual since they are pastel colored and asymmetrical and have sharp bevels. The windows on the upper levels had spider-web tracery, a popular design then. The windows to the right and left of the brick fireplace feature Shakespearean quotations from Richard II and Troilus and Cressida. It has been claimed by tour guides and articles over the years that the windows were made by Tiffany & Co despite the fact that the company rarely used beveled glass. This style of window is also found at Craigdarroch Castle in British Columbia, Canada, prompting architectural historian Jim Wolf to conclude that the windows were made by the same company. Wolf determined that glass artist John Mallon from Alexander Dunsmuir's company, the Pacific American Decorative Company, was the most likely artisan of the windows. This theory was confirmed when an envelope postmarked July 1894, which had the seal of Dunsmuir's company on it and a scribbled note that appears to be in Winchester's hand, was discovered in the wall of one of the dining rooms that was being restored. Many of the art glass windows that were purchased were never installed and have been housed in a storage room.

Windows in the Winchester Mystery House
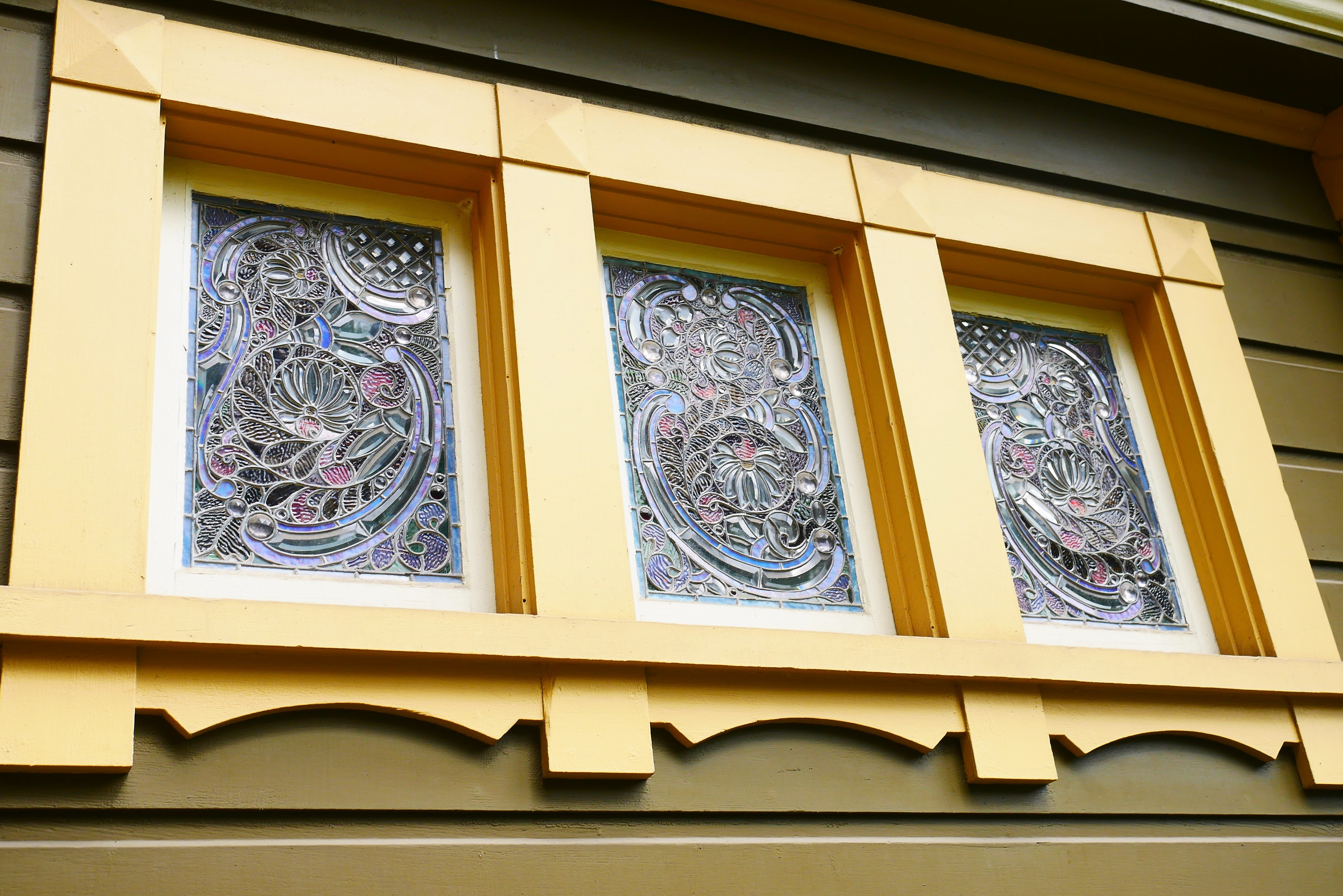
Stained glass from outside

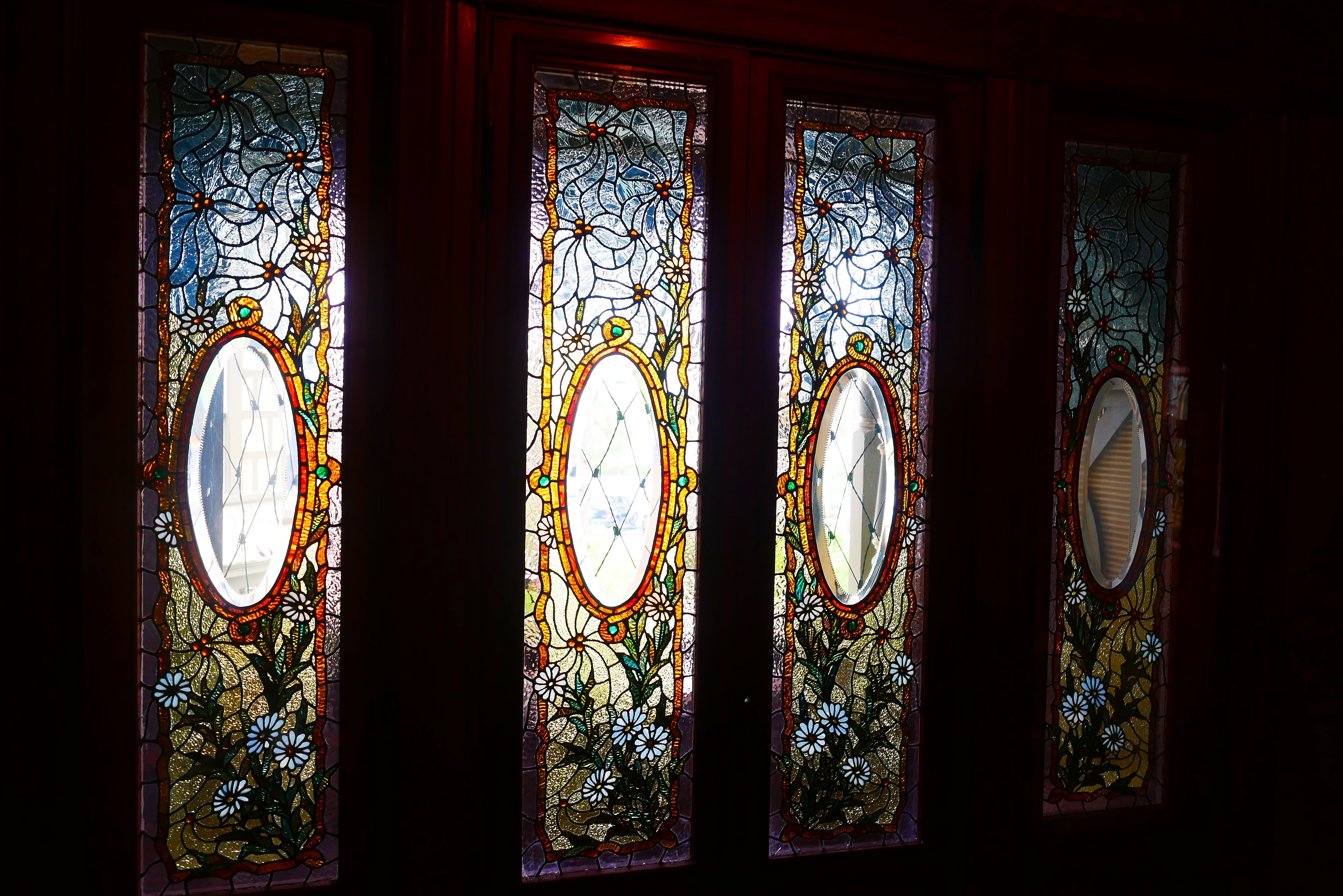
Stained glass with daisies

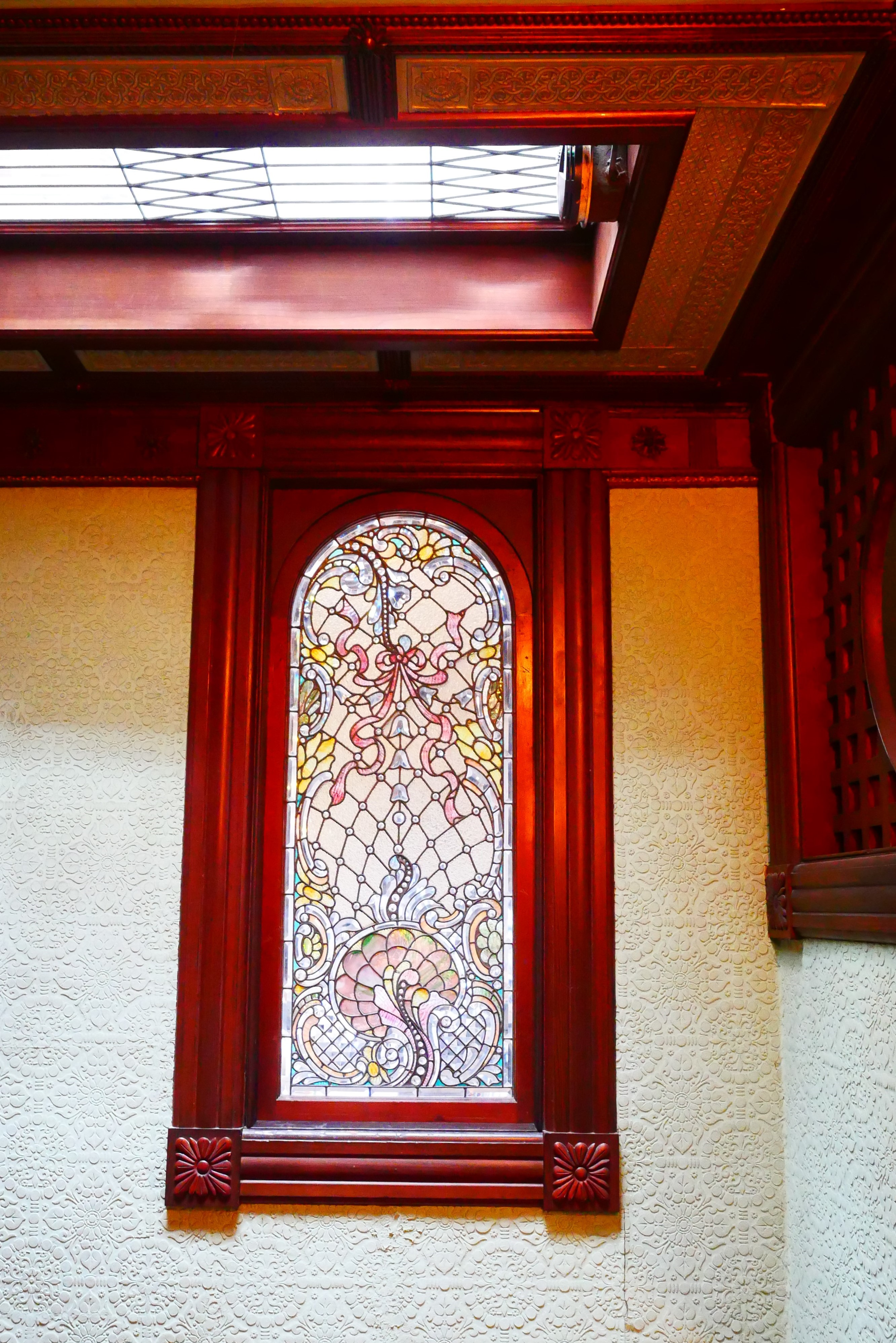
Stained glass windows (ceiling and wall)

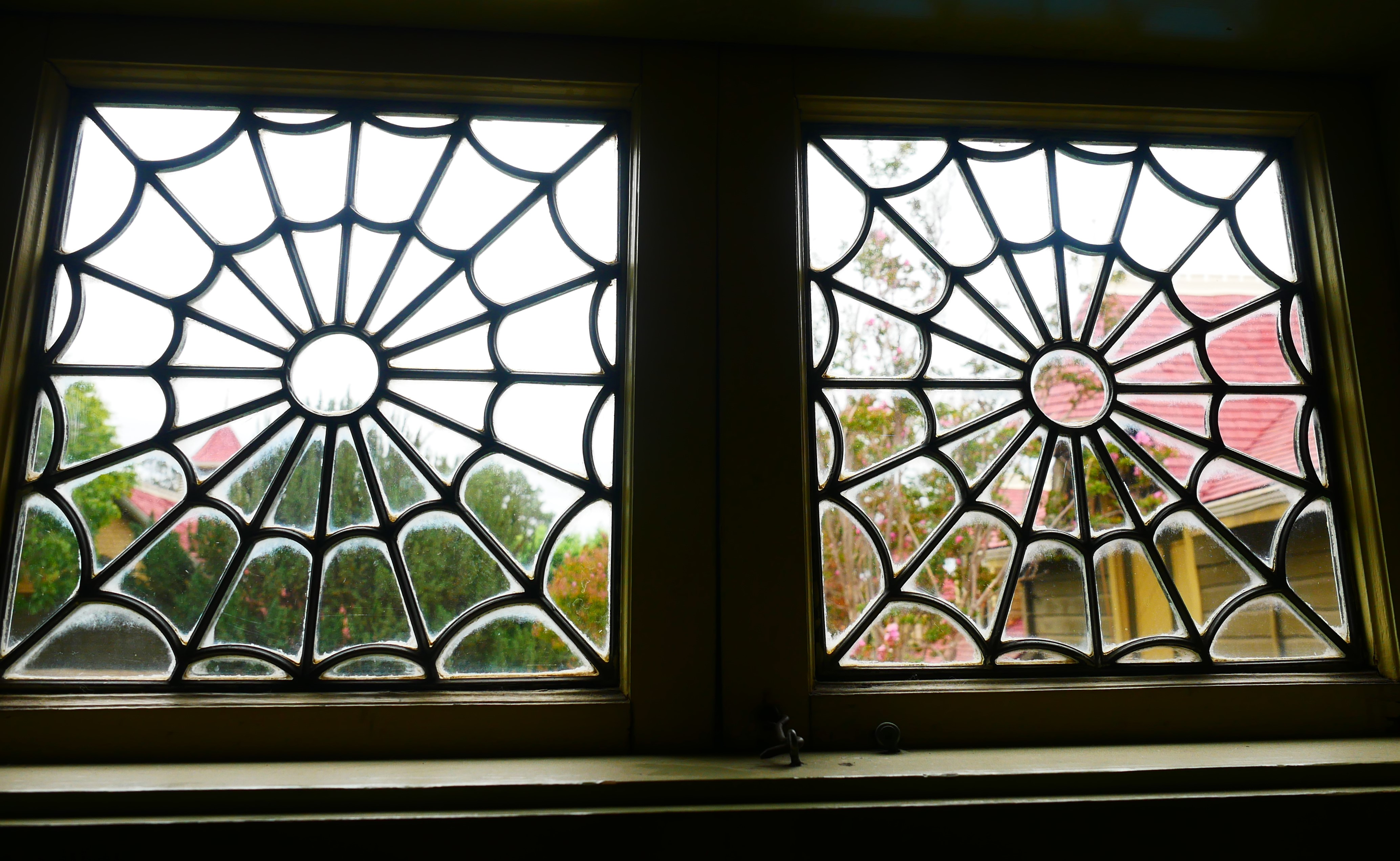
Spider-web motif

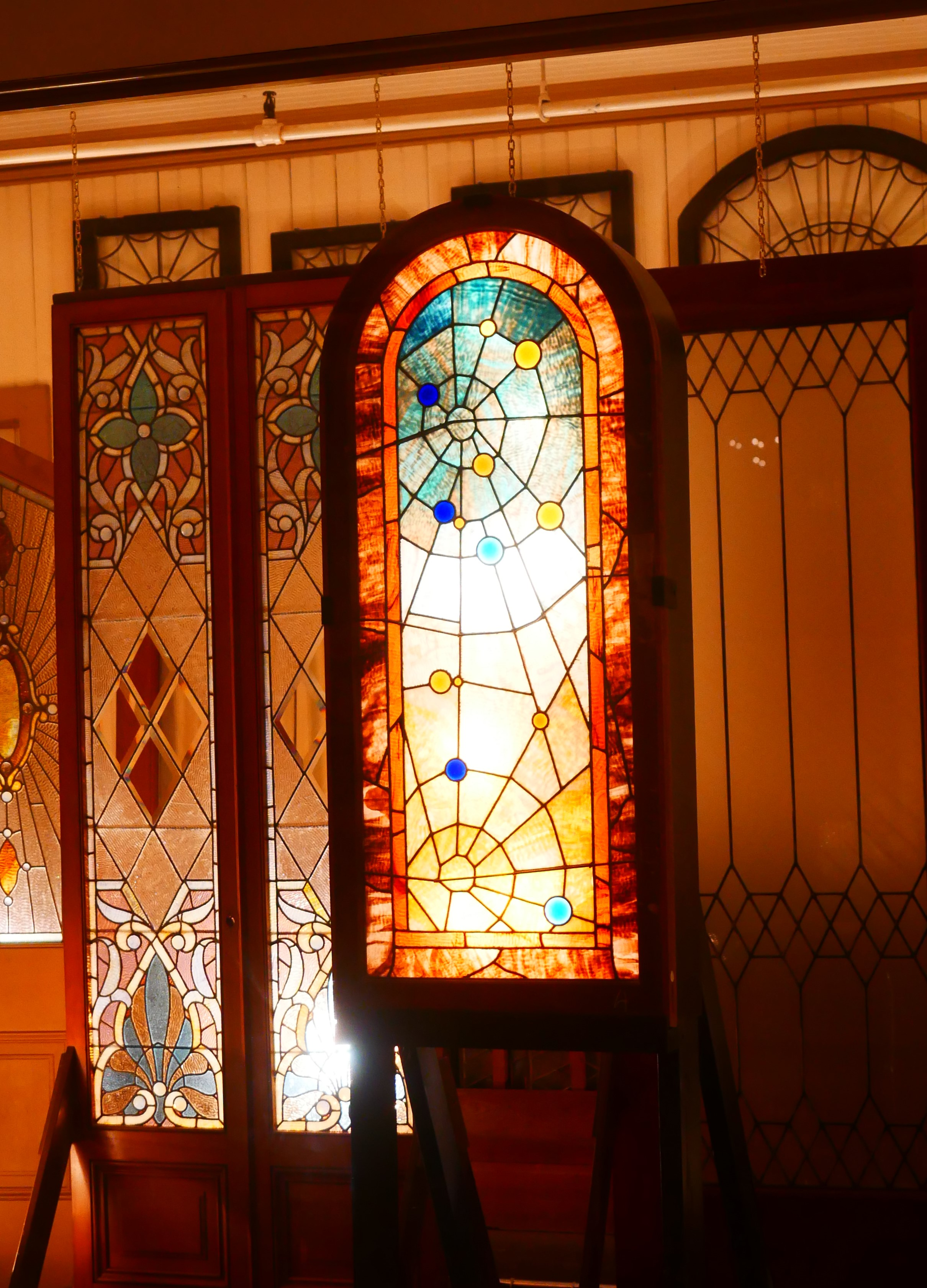
Spider-web stained glass

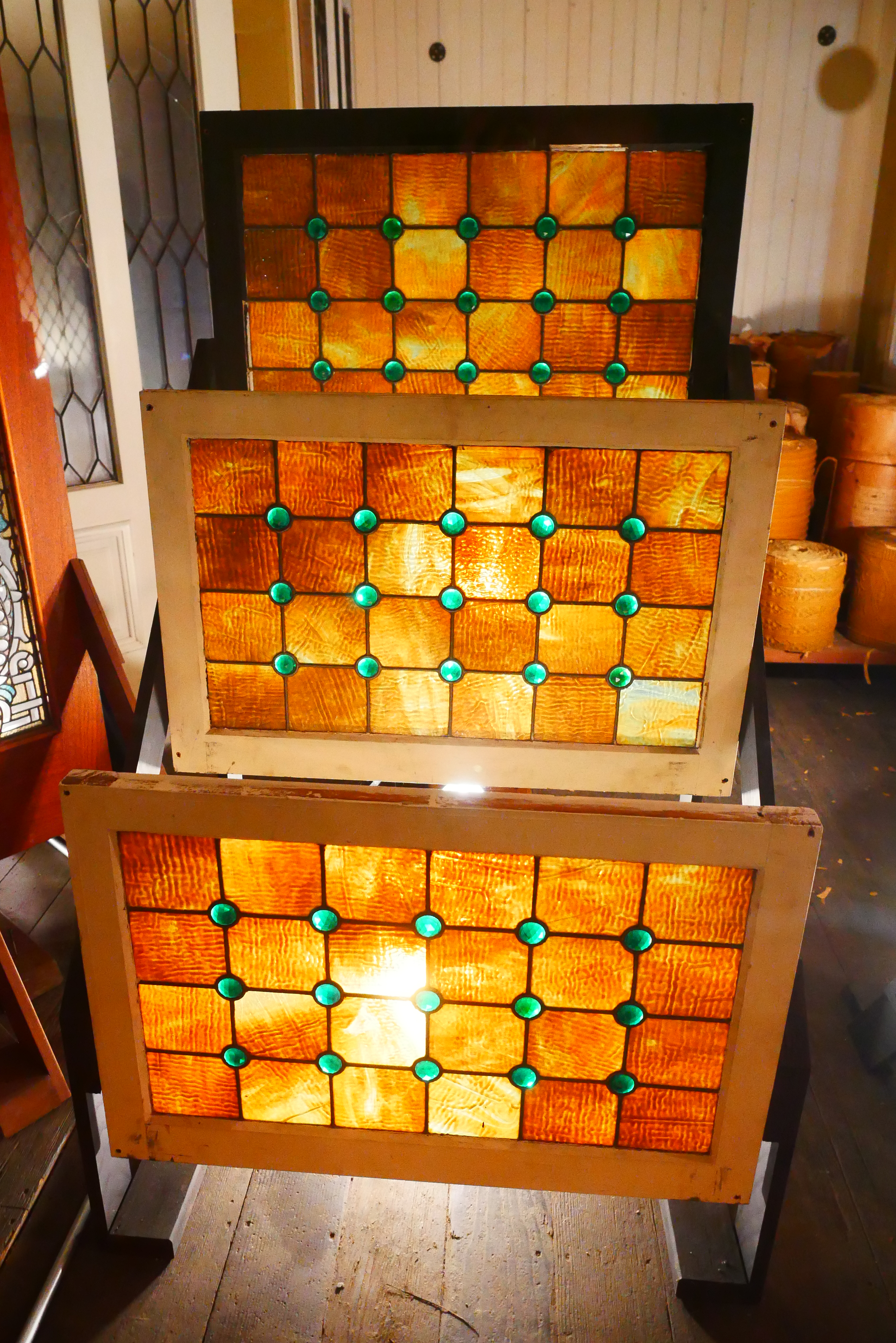
Stained glass windows in storage

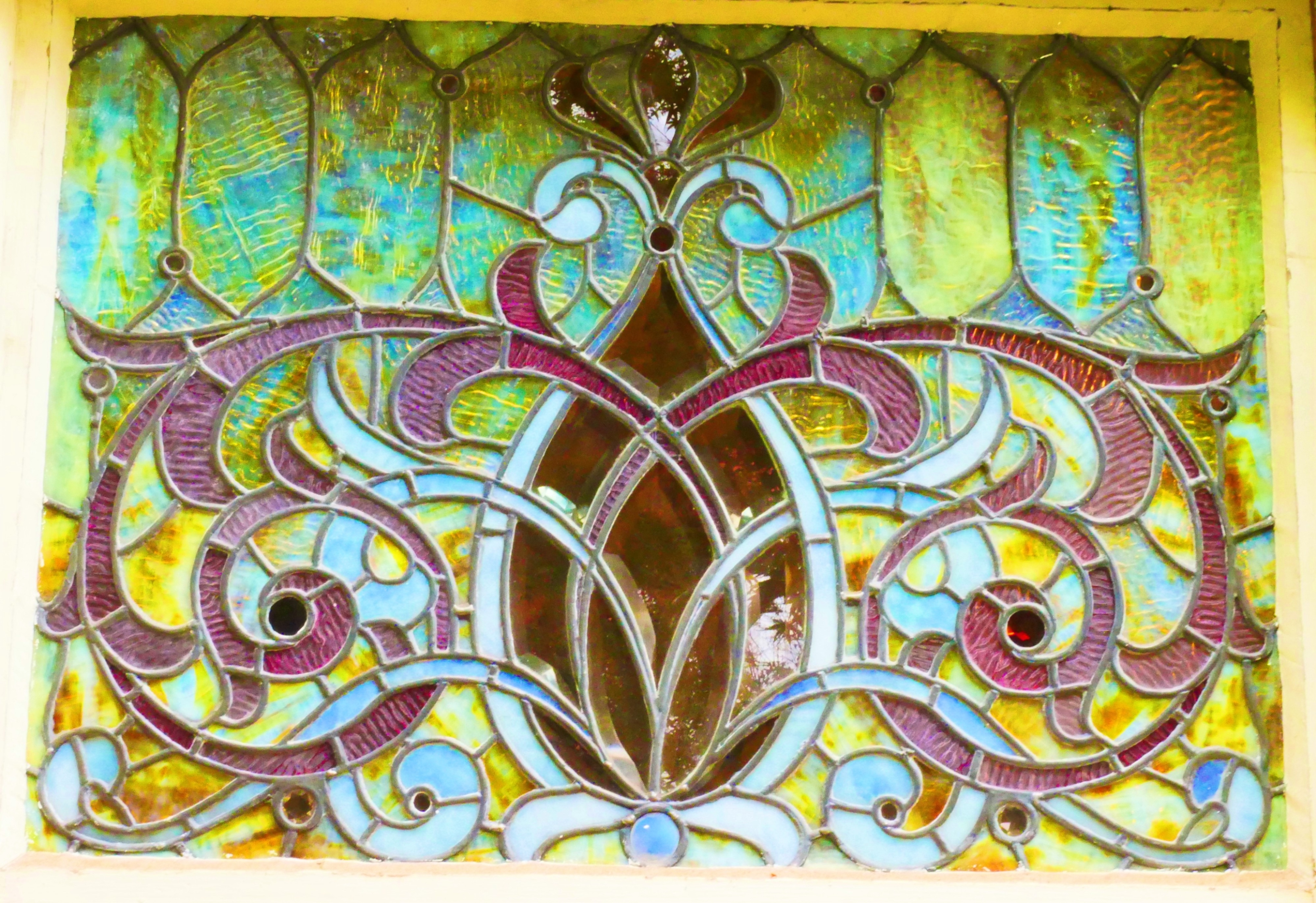
Stained glass from outside

Winchester would take regular breaks from construction to rest, sometimes for months, since she tired easily. It slowed construction considerably and is counter to the claims made in articles and by tour guides that she had the house under construction around the clock for thirty-eight years until her death in 1922.

At its largest the house had approximately 500 rooms.

According to Bruce Spoon, a student from San Jose State College who decided to write his master's thesis about Winchester in 1951, the reasons for building her large home were to keep workers employed and to express her artistic vision. He reached this conclusion after interviewing people who remembered her and after reviewing newspaper and magazine articles.

=== 1906 earthquake ===
When the 1906 San Francisco earthquake hit, the Llanada Villa was severely damaged. Though there are rumors that Winchester was trapped in the San Jose home, there is no evidence that she was there. She owned several homes in California, and after the earthquake spent most of her time at her home in Atherton.

The seven-story tower and most of the chimneys collapsed. One entire wing was destroyed along with the third- and fourth-story additions. Winchester had the rubble removed, but had little more done to the property after the earthquake. It left doors that opened to nothing where balconies had once been, pipes that were protruding from what were once window boxes, and staircases that once led to upper floors ending suddenly.

After 1910, owing to failing health, Winchester did not work on the San Jose home except for odd maintenance jobs and adding an elevator in 1916. Instead, she dedicated her time to finances and building an investment portfolio. Mary Jo Ignoffo claims that "She was far more successful constructing an investment portfolio than a mansion."

When Winchester died in 1922 the house had 160 rooms, 2,000 doors, 10,000 windows, 47 stairways, 47 fireplaces, 13 bathrooms, and 6 kitchens.

== As a tourist attraction ==
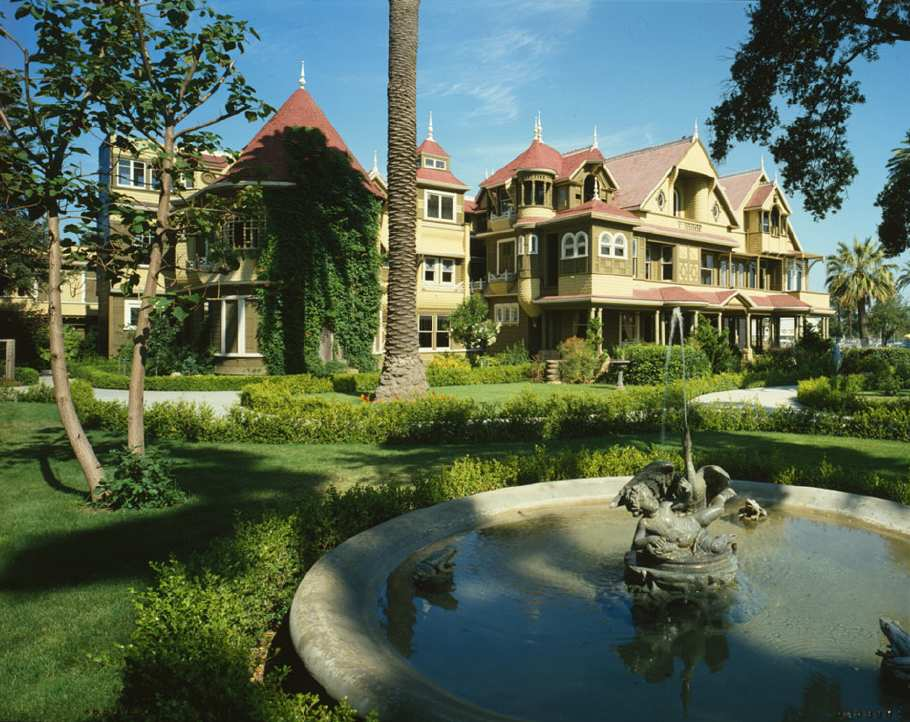
Undated photo, Heritage Documentation Programs, U.S. National Park Service

The house became a tourist attraction nine months after Winchester's death in 1922. The house was in disrepair and considered to be of no monetary value. A group of investors purchased the property, subsequently leasing the house to John and Mayme Brown who turned it into an attraction. They later purchased the house in 1931. There were many room additions and deletions made to the home after Winchester's death.

The first tour guide of the house was Mayme Brown. Past neighbors, friends, and workers for Winchester were distressed when they read about superstitious claims being made about the house and Winchester, and were upset the Browns were making money from falsehoods. They described Winchester as clearheaded and savvier with finances and business than most men.

In 1924, Harry Houdini briefly visited the house and was reportedly impressed by its unusual layout and architectural novelties, but could not make a detailed investigation because of more pressing engagements. According to some accounts, Houdini suggested tour operators use "Winchester mystery house" as a promotional name for the property.

When Keith Kittle, a past Disneyland and Frontier Village employee, became the general manager in 1973, the house was in poor shape. He had the house renovated in the 1970s and 1980s and added a Winchester rifle museum. He sought historical landmark status and began an advertising campaign that included large billboards along the highways. The billboards feature a silhouetted house with implications that a ghost encounter was possible. Attendance increased as he played off the history and superstition that was already circulating. Kittle was general manager until 1996.

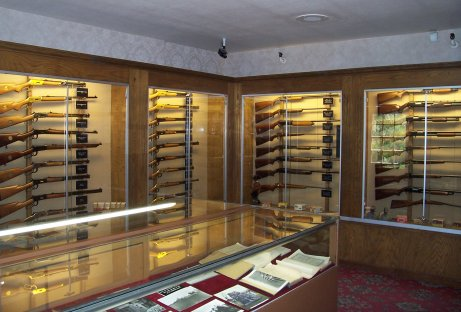
Winchester Rifle Museum

As of 1963, after both John and Mayme Brown had passed away, the house was incorporated as Winchester Mystery House, LLC, a private business that represents the descendants of the Browns and continues to preserve Sarah Winchester’s house. Captive of the Labyrinth author Mary Jo Ignoffo wrote that tour guides are required to follow a script emphasizing fabrications and inaccuracies. According to Ignoffo, one guide lamented,

"I feel so torn because I have to tell people untruths! Every time I go through the house and have to talk about 13s and other 'kooky' things, my heart breaks a little for Sarah ... I have to bite my tongue every time I hear a guest say, 'what a nutcase.'"

== Legends and lore ==
Winchester's story has been embellished over the years by various rumors, hyperbole, and myths, and popular writers have misrepresented or invented details about the house and its owner in order to enhance the legend.

=== Inheritance ===
Claims of Winchester inheriting as much as $20 million and earning $1,000 per day in royalties from her inheritance can be found in tourist literature purchased at the Winchester Mystery House. Ignoffo states that her husband's estate in 1881 was valued at $362,330 (equal to $12,088,078 today), but this amount included approximately $300,000 of stock that Winchester would only inherit when her mother-in-law died, which did not happen until 1898. With the addition of her husband's Winchester Repeating Arms Company shares, she owned a total of 777 shares valuing $77,700, which paid average dividends of $7,770 annually between 1880 and 1885.

=== Moving to California ===
Myths around her decision to move from the East Coast to California are thought to have originated from author Susy Smith in her book Prominent American Ghosts, published in 1967. In Smith's version of events, Winchester visited a medium in Boston named Adam Coons who told her that she and her family were being haunted by the ghosts of people killed by Winchester rifles, that she must construct a house for these ghosts, and that she must never complete the project. This assertion of Winchester meeting with a medium has been repeated in brochures and articles ever since. According to Ignoffo, while it is plausible that Winchester did meet with a psychic medium since it was a common practice for women of her status at the time, there is no evidence that she did so.

Emily Mace, a scholar, and others have looked through issues of Banner of Light, which was a spiritualist periodical, and in the Boston city directories, which listed spiritualists in the area, and no one named Adam Coons could be found.

=== Neverending construction ===
Beginning around 1895, Winchester started appearing in newspapers. The articles in these local papers were filled with speculation about Winchester and the ongoing construction of her San Jose home. Her lack of interaction with neighbors and the known fact that her money came from the firearms industry fed into a superstitious narrative, despite large, ornate homes being commonly built by the wealthy. The newspapers declared that the reason that the construction was ongoing was that Winchester feared she would have bad luck if the construction would stop. This theory eventually grew into stories that she believed she would die if construction stopped.

Strange Story: A Woman Who Thinks She'll Die When Her House Is Built.

Ten years ago the handsome residence was apparently ready for occupancy, but improvements and additions are constantly being made, for the reason, it is said, that the owner of the house believes that when it is entirely completed, she will die. This superstition has resulted in the construction of a maze of domes, turrets, cupolas and towers, covering territory enough for a castle.

— San Jose Daily News, March 29, 1895.

In the Historic American Buildings Survey (HABS), when it added the Winchester home to the National Register of Historic Places in 1981, they incorrectly stated that the construction lasted 38 years, and reiterated that Winchester believed she must continue building or she would die. HABS also incorrectly listed the purchase date as 1884 when county records state the purchase was not until 1886.

There were some articles published against the superstitious slant. In one, an unidentified acquaintance refuted these superstitious accusations, stating that they were nonsense and that Winchester was an unusually sensible woman.

Only Gossip: No Truth in the Story of the Winchester Palace.

If she wants to build a castle on her premises near Campbell, she should be permitted to do so without ascribing her motives to foolish superstitions. If people of wealth who settle in Santa Clara are to be ridiculed when they spend their money lavishly, we might as well put up the bars ... After awhile the lady might not want to have a nail driven about the place for fear that someone would run off to a newspaper with a cock-and-bull story.

— San Jose Evening News, 1897, acquaintance of Sarah Winchester.

While Winchester lived at the Atherton house, her relatives stayed at the San Jose home for almost a year in 1915 to attend the Panama-Pacific International Exposition in San Francisco, which ran for nine months. No construction happened during this time and the staff closed up the house for a week to attend the fair.

Ignoffo states that there is no evidence that Winchester was compelled to keep her construction project running and preferred to focus on estate planning.

=== Labyrinthine construction ===
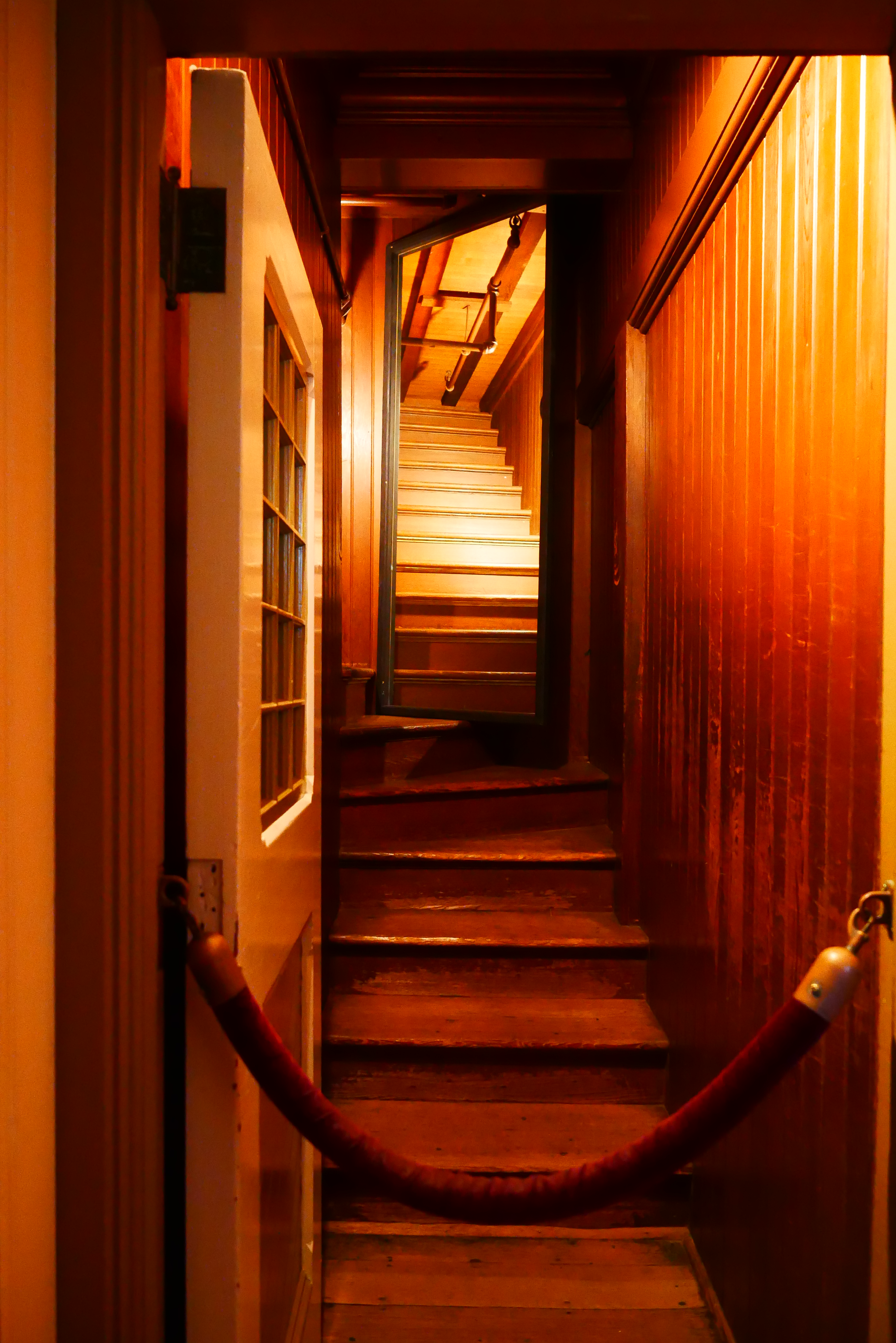
Winchester Mystery House hallway staircase to nowhere

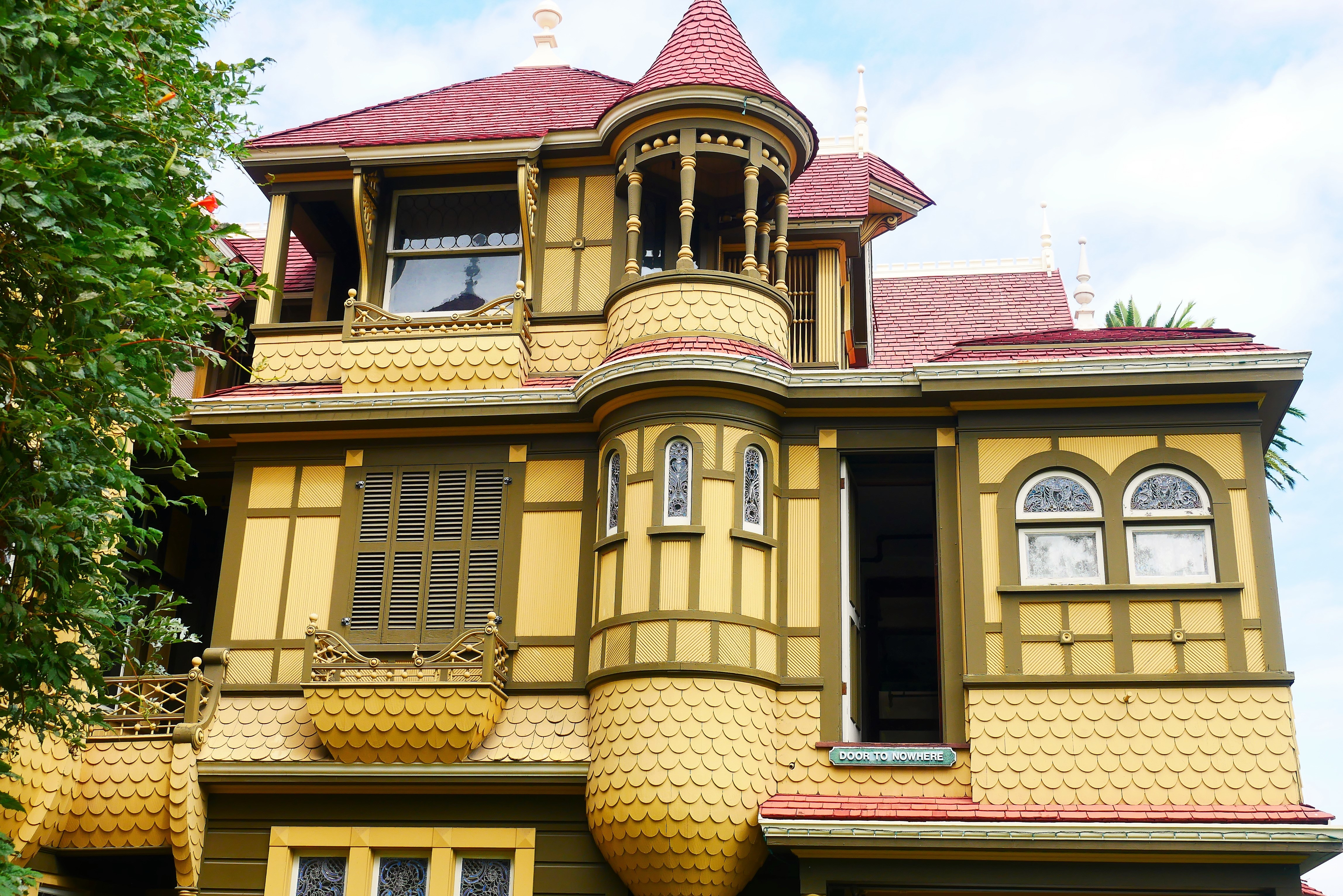
Doorway to nowhere

The belief that Winchester built her house in its strange, maze-like manner to confuse and keep spirits from harming her and that her sanity was questionable started in the mid-1890s and has grown in scale since her death. The doors and windows that open to nothing, the unusually shallow stairs, the stairs that end in a ceiling, interior barred windows and trap doors in the floor are used to confirm Winchester's spirituality and poor state of mind. According to paranormal investigators Nickell and Ignoffo, these house oddities have simple explanations. The barred windows were previously exterior windows blocked off as the house additions grew. The doors and windows that opened to nothing resulted from the 1906 earthquake and the severe damage that happened to the house. The small steps were built because of Winchester's declining health. The trap doors were constructed in a greenhouse room where excess water could run and be piped to an outdoor garden. After the damage from the earthquake, Winchester did not rebuild the house.

=== Bell tower ===
The tower bell was used to call workmen and to serve as a fire alarm on the property. According to Joe Nickell, fanciful claims later arose that it was used to "summon spirits".

=== Ghostly music ===
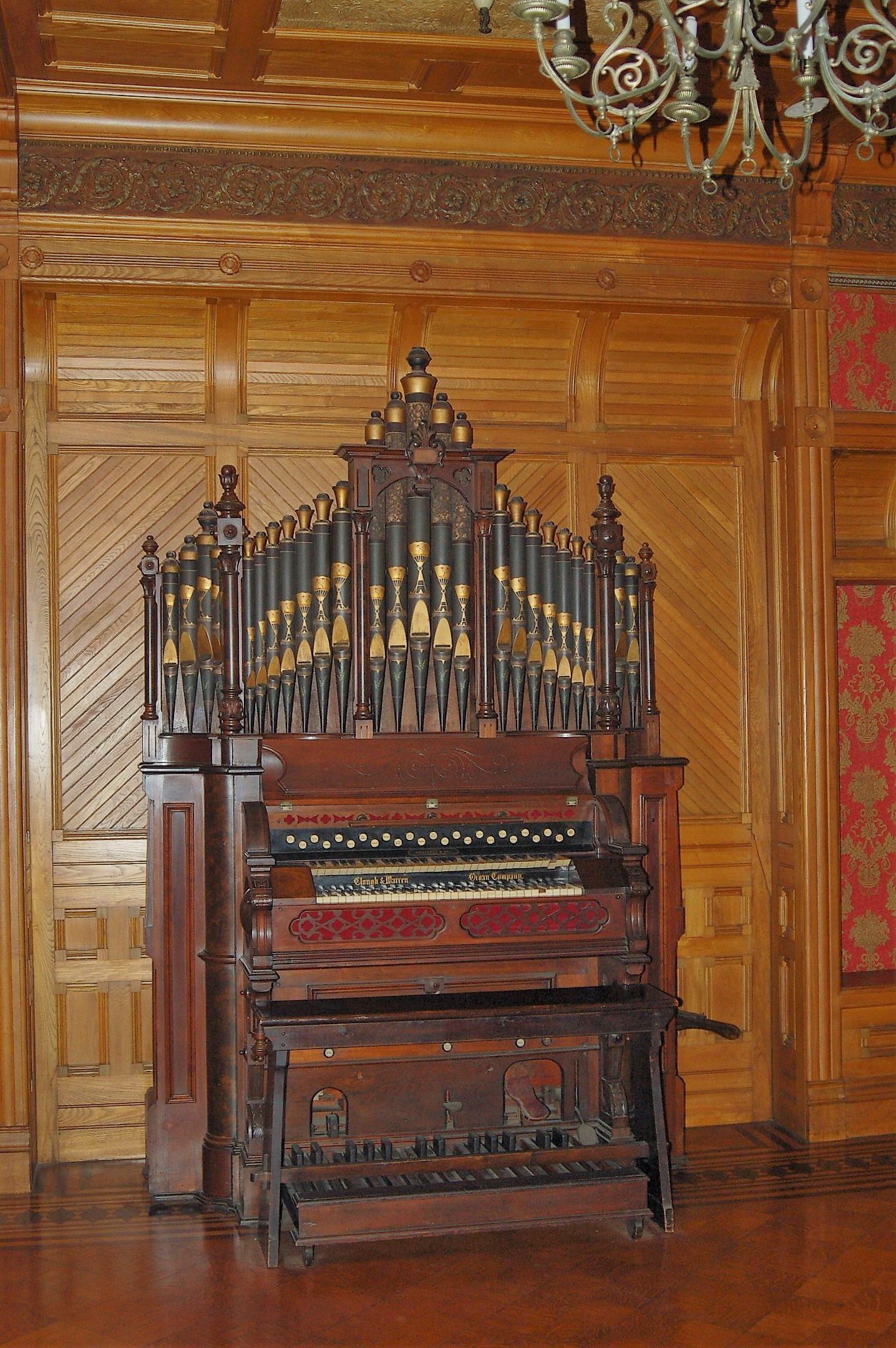
Winchester pipe organ

According to Joe Nickell, claims that local residents heard "ghostly music" coming from the house are explained by the fact that Winchester often played the pump organ in the Grand Ballroom when she was unable to sleep.

=== Parties for spirits ===
According to Joe Nickell, claims that Winchester held parties for the spirits in her home featuring lavish dishes served on gold plates kept in a safe are fanciful and unsubstantiated. Nickell wrote that after her death when the safe was opened, no gold plates were found, only personal mementos and a lock of her baby's hair.

=== Gun guilt ===
At the turn of the twentieth century, the most common belief regarding Winchester's house building was that she felt tremendous guilt resulting from all the deaths caused by Winchester rifles and from inheriting so much money from the arms company. Ignoffo claims that it is unlikely Winchester had any guilt, since in the 1800s the Winchester Repeating Arms Company was seen as a success, and weapons were viewed as a necessity for survival. Nevertheless, this story persists today.

=== Health and superstition ===
Ignoffo and paranormal investigator Joe Nickell report that as Winchester aged, particularly after 1900 as her health issues grew worse, which included arthritis, missing teeth and neuritis, she became more private and reclusive. This reluctance to appear in public or to socialize with her peers gave her a mysterious reputation feeding the gossip in the community and local newspapers which fuelled the rumor that she was superstitious. Winchester's companion of many years, Miss Henrietta Severs, states Winchester had no superstitious beliefs. Winchester's relatives, employees and gardeners never made claims that she was superstitious, guilt-ridden or crazed.

All her employees were named as beneficiaries in her will.

=== Presidents ===
Rumors surrounding the alleged ill mental health of Winchester include that she twice declined to host a U.S. President. In 1901, President William McKinley visited and a committee to arrange accommodations was formed, but Winchester did not extend an invitation. The President and his official coaches drove past the mansion without stopping. In 1903, President Theodore Roosevelt visited the area. Legend states that Winchester would not open a locked gate to admit him. This was not true; President Roosevelt had no interest in meeting Winchester, since a stop at her home could have been used to promote rifle sales and he did not want to be seen as endorsing any product.

Despite there being plausible reasons for her not hosting the Presidents, these instances furthered rumors that she was a "crank" and not of sound mind.

=== The number thirteen ===
According to lore, architectural features such as thirteen bedrooms, thirteen bathrooms, and thirteen windows in certain rooms are due to Winchester's apparent fascination with the number thirteen. However, according to carpenter James Perkins, these items and "the more irregular features, which have made the house a world-famed oddity were built after Mrs Winchester's death." The first time that this apparent superstition appeared was in an article printed in 1929. Subsequently, it has been mentioned in most articles about Winchester and her house.

=== Nightly séances ===
Winchester's staff, who spent every day with her, stated she had no interest in séances and there is no record of them being held in the house. Nevertheless, a false urban legend has arisen claiming she held nightly séances in the blue room or in a closet by herself from midnight until two in the morning, talking to ghosts about what construction should be accomplished the following day. In addition to the lack of records found about seances at Llanada Villa, the closet séances were unlikely given that they were usually social events and not done by individuals and records show that the blue room was the gardener's bedroom.

=== Hauntings ===
Visitors and tour guides claim to have experienced cold spots, footsteps, cooking smells, odd sounds, whispering, doors and windows slamming, and feelings of being watched. Investigator Joe Nickell explains that they could be the result of confirmation bias and suggestibility due to publicity and rumors that the house is the most haunted house in the United States or even the world; or that over a thousand ghosts reside in the home. Nickell reports one example where a shadowy figure thought to be a ghost turned out to be a staff member at the house. According to Nickell, there is no evidence that the house is haunted, and that alleged whispering sounds can be imagined or due to wind. Additionally, it is common for large, rambling, and drafty old houses to have temperature variations, and the house's settling and exterior temperature changes can explain odd noises.

== In popular culture ==
- In 1960, the Winchester Mystery House was used as the Cyrus Zorba House in the film 13 Ghosts.
- In 1966, the house was featured on the cover for the single "Psychotic Reaction" by the garage rock band Count Five.
- The tale of the Winchester Mystery House was inspiration for The Haunted Mansion ride at Disney theme parks, the first of which opened in 1969 at Disneyland.
- The house is the primary setting for Michaela Roessner's 1993 science fiction novel Vanishing Point in which it becomes the home of a squatter community following the disappearance of most of the human race.
- The house is the setting of a subplot in the 1997 Tim Powers fantasy novel Earthquake Weather.
- The plot of the 2002 miniseries Rose Red (written by Stephen King) was inspired by the lore surrounding Sarah Winchester and the Winchester Mystery House.
- The Haunting of Winchester is a ghost story musical by composer Craig Bohmler and writer Mary Bracken Phillips that takes place in the house. It was commissioned by the San Jose Repertory Theatre for its 25th anniversary season and premiered in September–October 2005.
- The British paranormal TV investigation show Most Haunted Live! conducted a seven-hour live TV investigation of the house in an episode that aired live in the U.S. only on October 19, 2007.
- In 2011, Ghost Adventures featured the Winchester Mystery House in the fourth episode of season five.
- In the MythBusters episode "Smell of Fear", the build team visited the Winchester Mystery House to look around and later watch "one of the scariest movies of all time" on a television that they set up in the grand ballroom, with the purpose of determining if fear does smell different by gathering their sweat samples for testing at the end of the night. While the team watched the movie in the dark, the show's crew randomly made loud noises to increase the frightening experience.
- Sarah Winchester, Phantom Opera is a 24-minute film by French filmmaker Bertrand Bernello that had its North American premiere at the 54th New York Film Festival in October 2016.
- The house was featured in seasons 1 and 4 of BuzzFeed Unsolved Supernatural in episodes where Ryan Bergara and Shane Madej stayed there overnight.
- In 2017, the house was featured on an episode of Ghost Brothers.
- In 2017, Em Schulz told the story of the house to Christine Schiefer on the first episode of our And That's Why We Drink.
- Features of the house are referenced in I the Mighty's song "111 Winchester".
- In 2017, filming took place on the property for the film Winchester, featuring Helen Mirren as Sarah Winchester. The film was released on February 23, 2018. In trailers and on posters, the film is noted to be based on a true story despite evidence that much of the stories in the movie are disputed in Mary Jo Ignoffo's book Captive of the Labyrinth.
- It is likely that the house influenced the design of the Finch family house in 2017 video game What Remains of Edith Finch.
- In 2018, the house was described in "Locked Away", an episode of the podcast Lore.
- In 2019, the podcast Criminal produced an episode about the house titled "The Widow and the Winchester".
- House of Penance, a Dark Horse comic by Peter Tomasi, Ian Bertram and Dave Stewart, is "perhaps the first biographical horror graphic novel" that illustrates the house as haunted and Sarah as obsessed.
- Mrs Winchester's Gun Club is a 2019 adult fiction novel by Douglas Bruton concerning Sarah Winchester that tells a group of stories voiced by the victims of Winchester guns.
- In January 2021, an episode of the award-winning podcast This Paranormal Life was released that discussed the Winchester Mystery House. The hosts deemed all claims of haunting to be false.
- The "Winchester Mystery House" episode of Destination Fear (Season 4, Episode 5) aired on December 23, 2022.
- In June 2024, content creation group OfflineTV featured the Winchester Mystery House in a video on their YouTube channel, where they played hide and seek and explored the history and myths surrounding the property.
- In October 2025, pinball manufacturer Barrels of Fun announced their third title, Winchester Mystery House, which is inspired by the unique design and supernatural elements associated with the Winchester mansion.
- In September 2026, rapper Buckshot released Winchester, based on the story of the house.

== Gallery ==
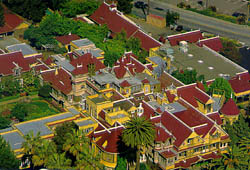
Aerial view Winchester Mystery House

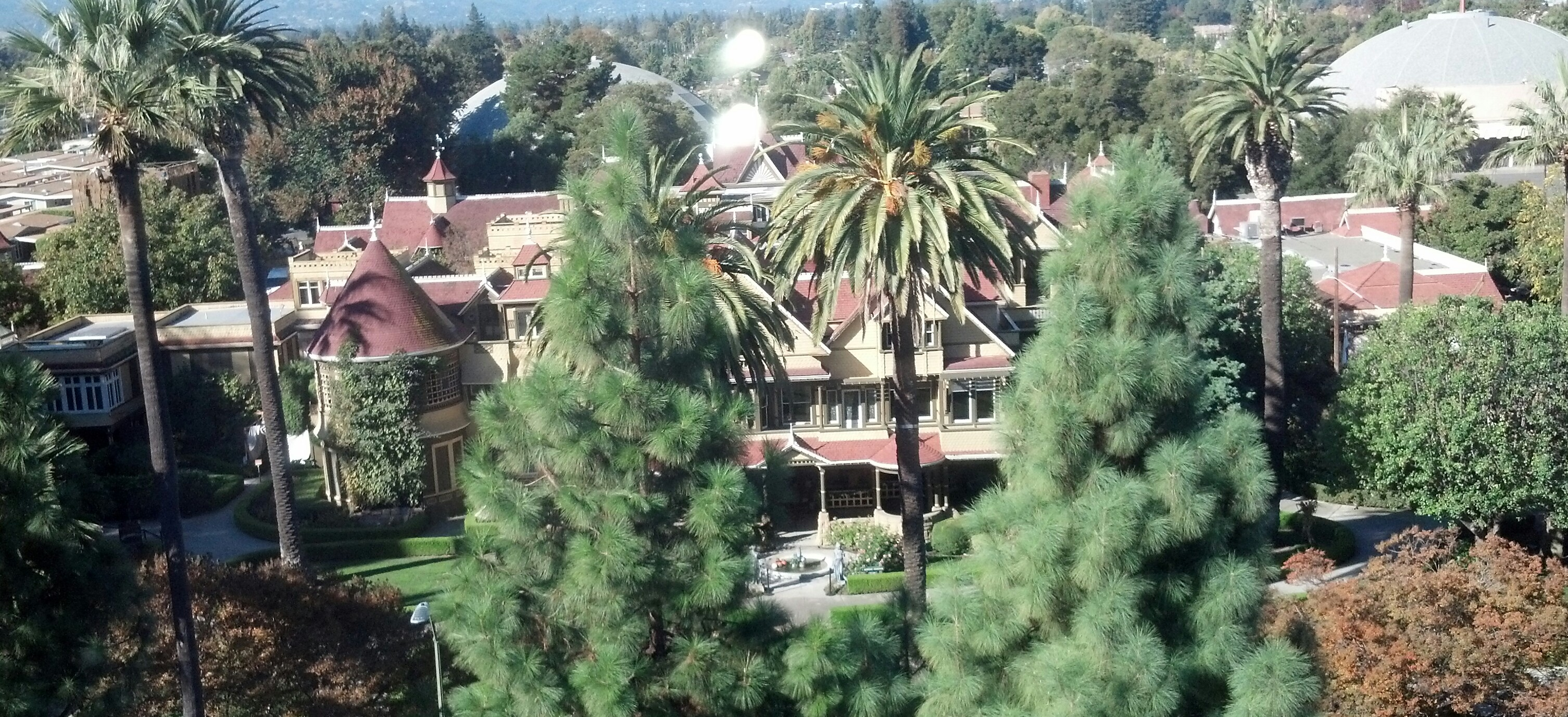
A view of the house from a highrise building to the south

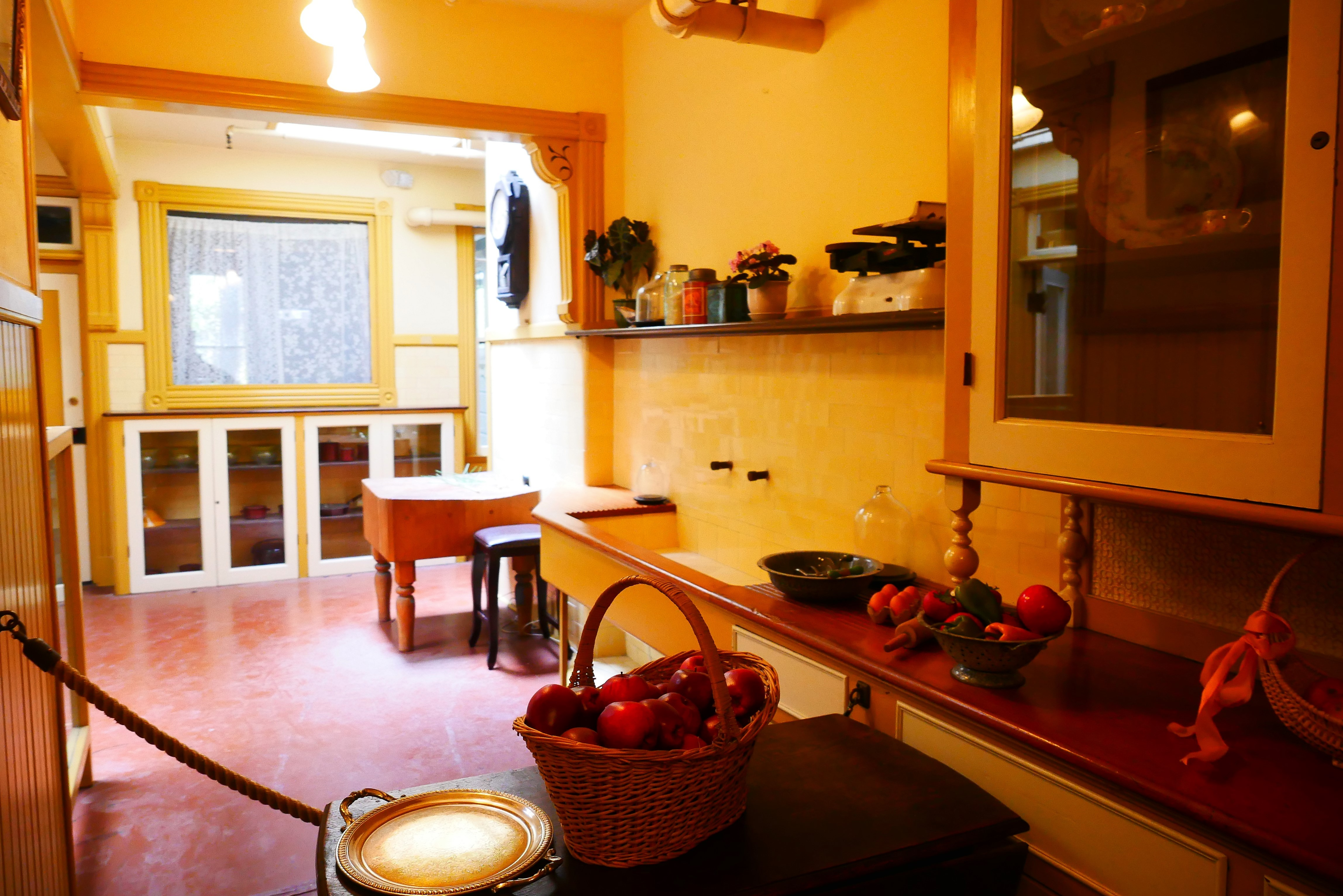
Kitchen

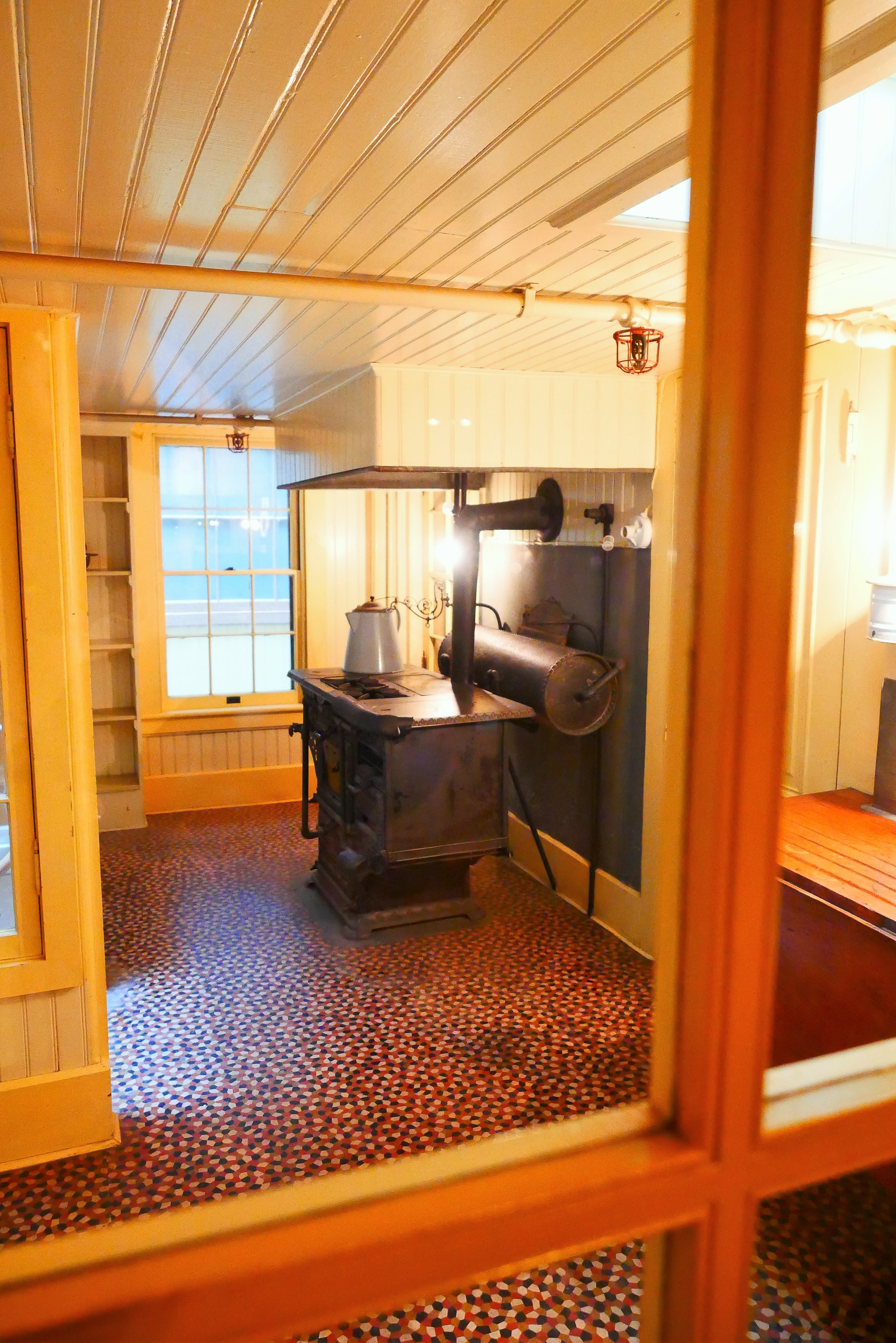
Kitchen stove

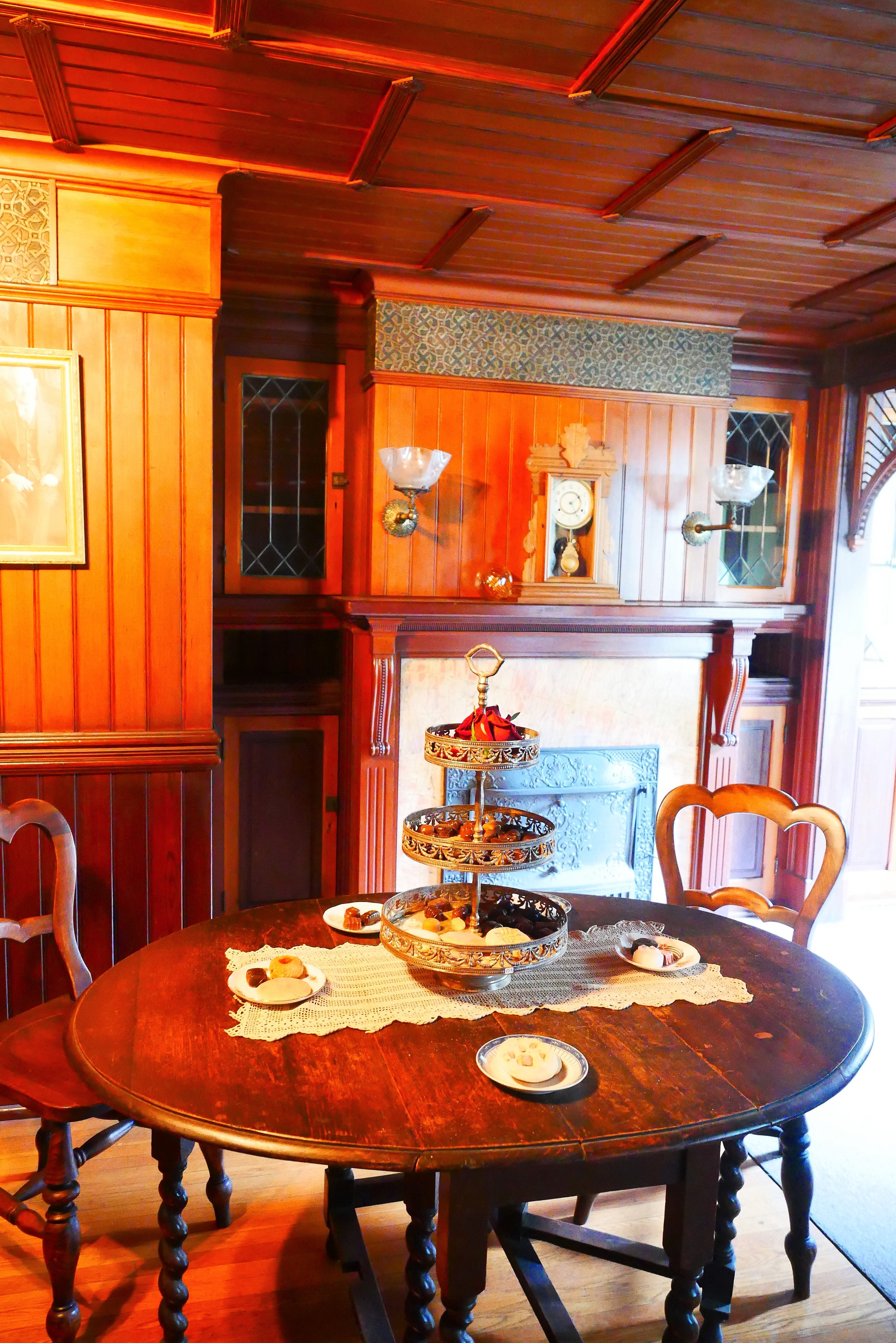
Dining table

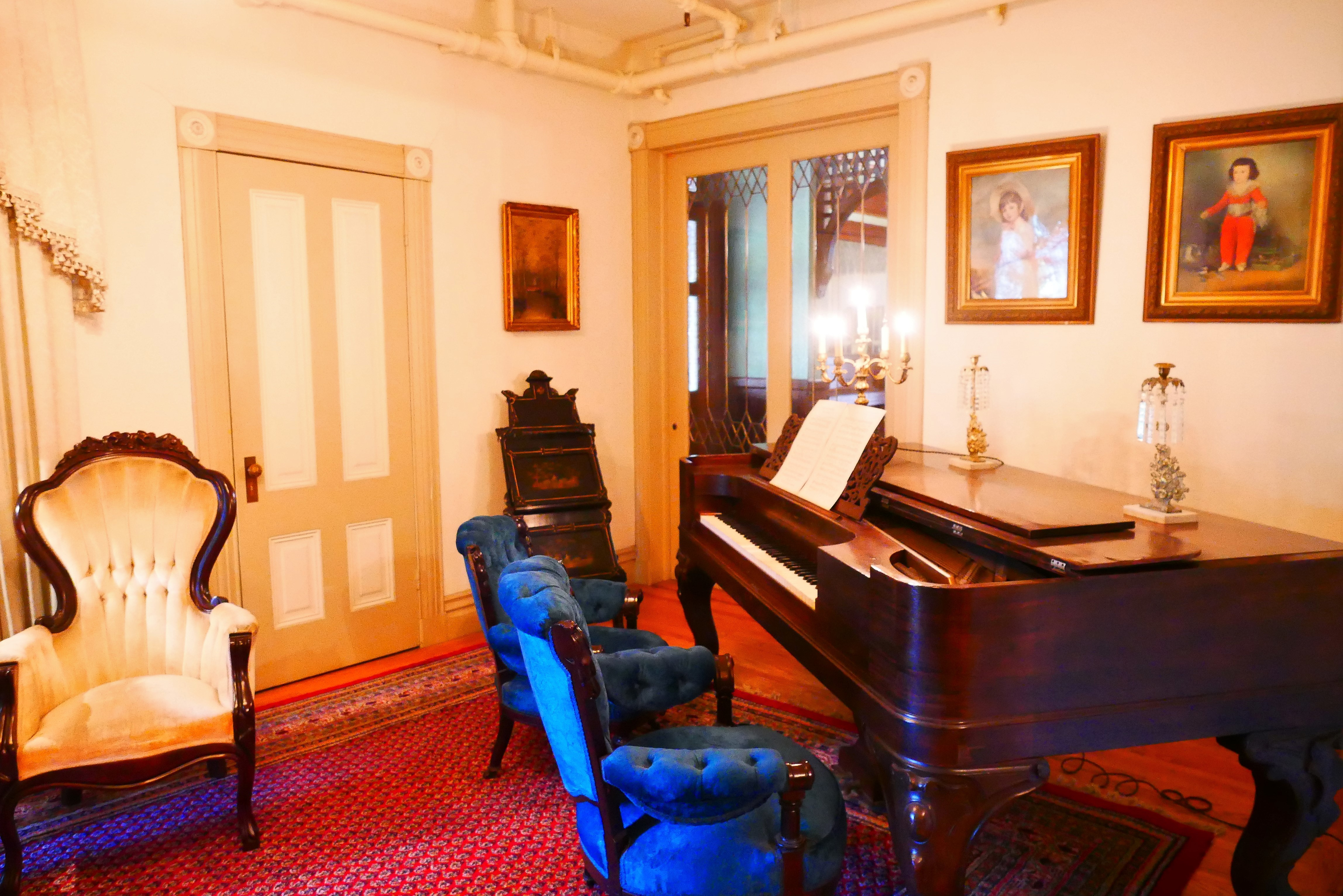
Piano

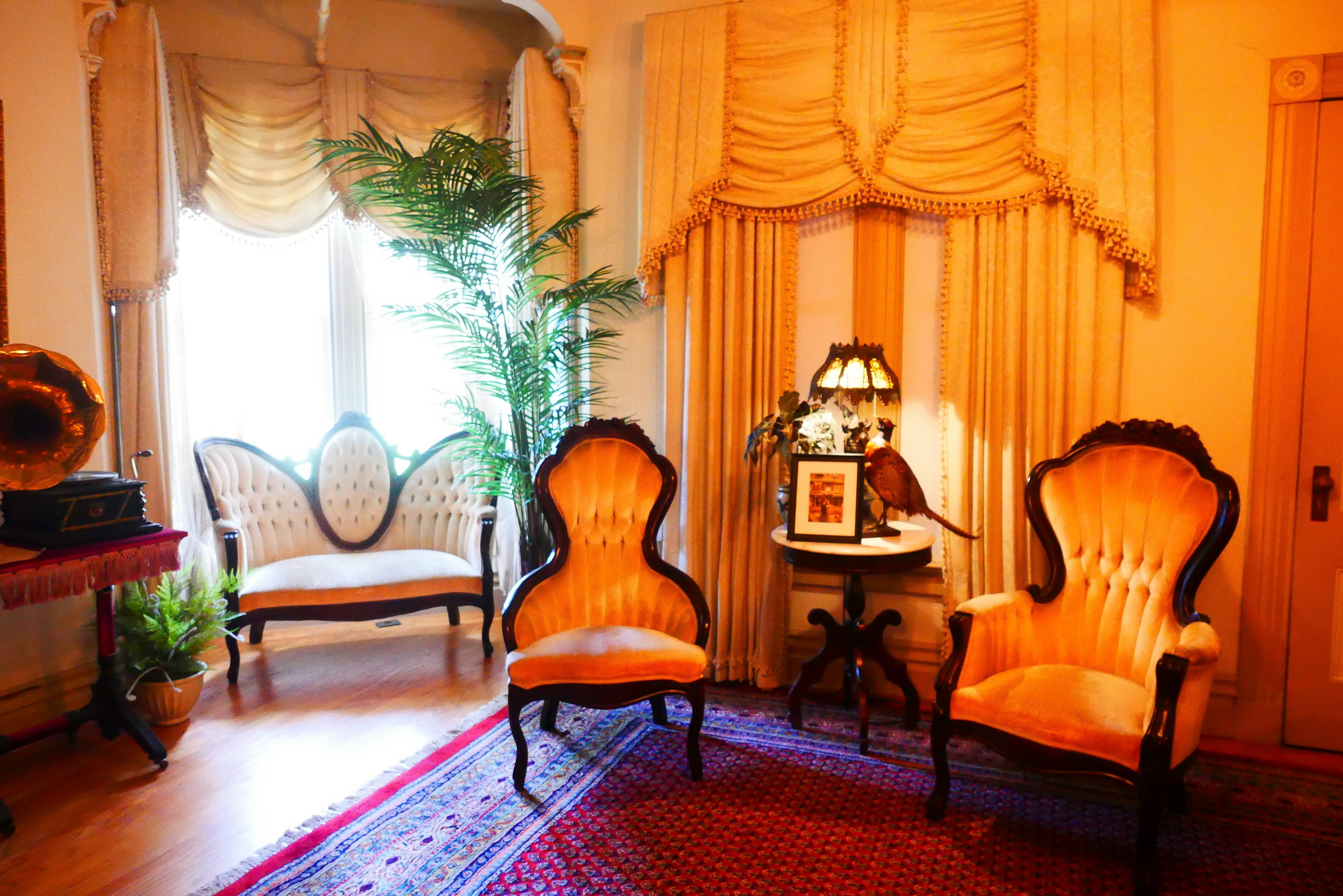
Living room

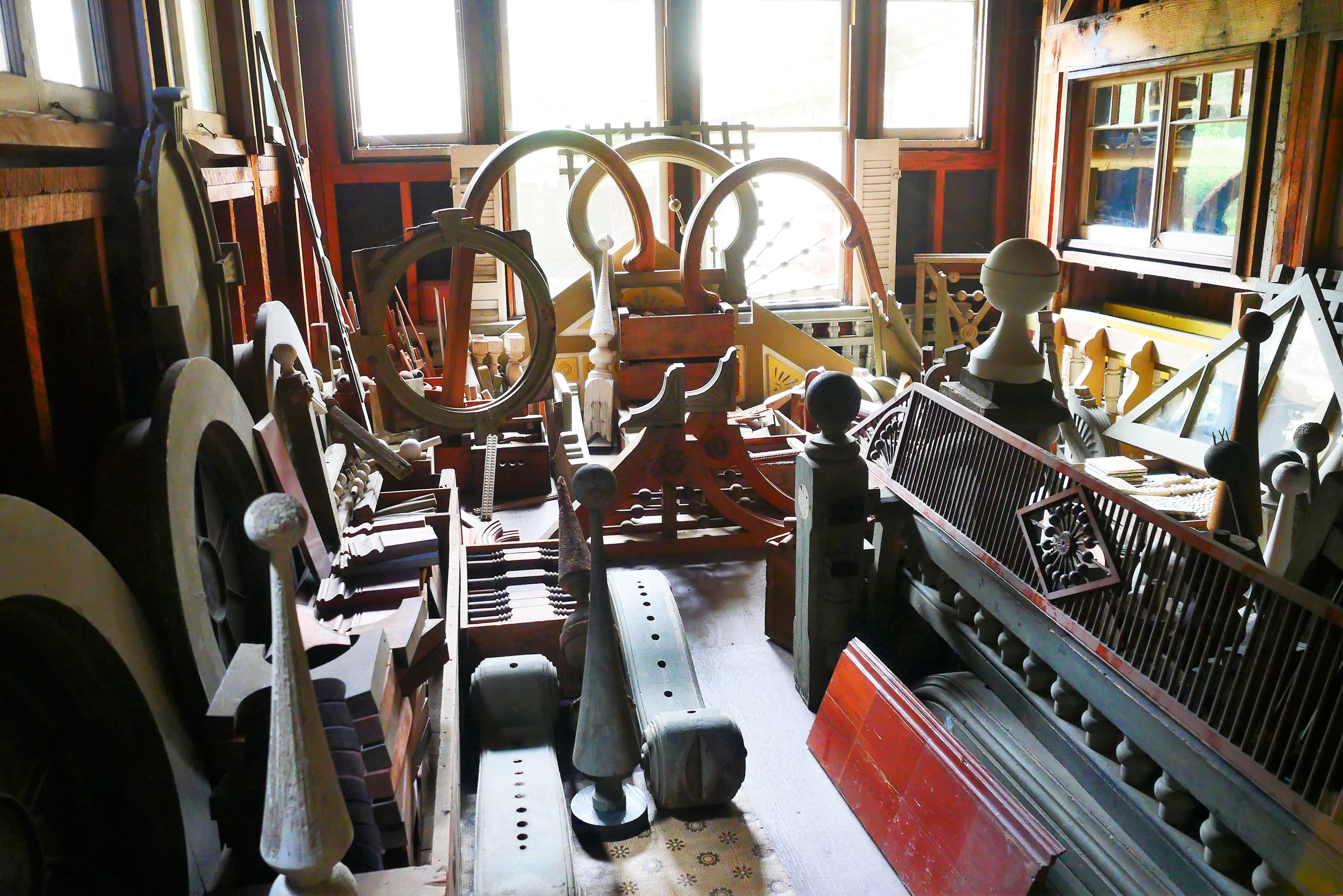
Extra wood fennels

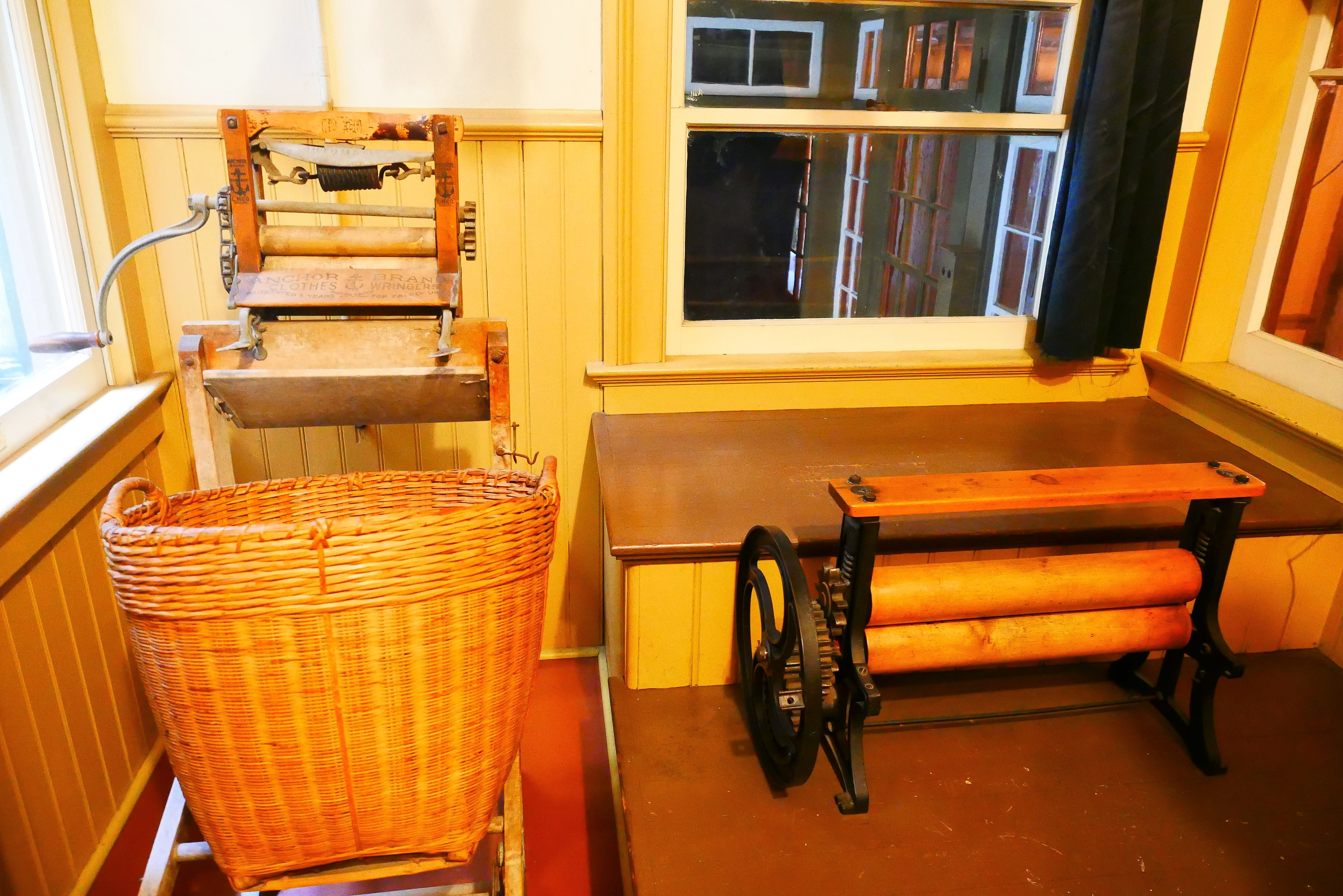
Laundry

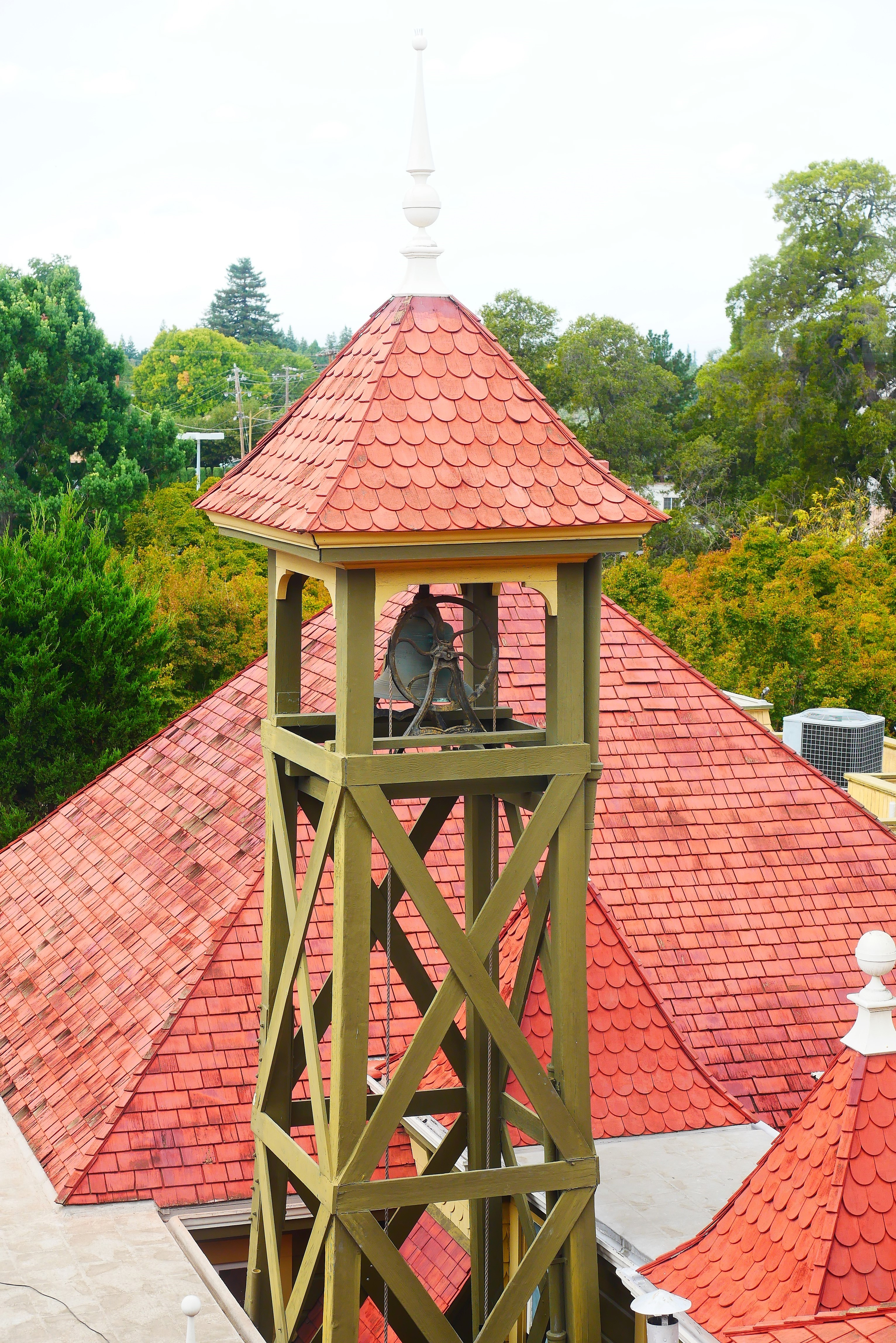
Bell tower

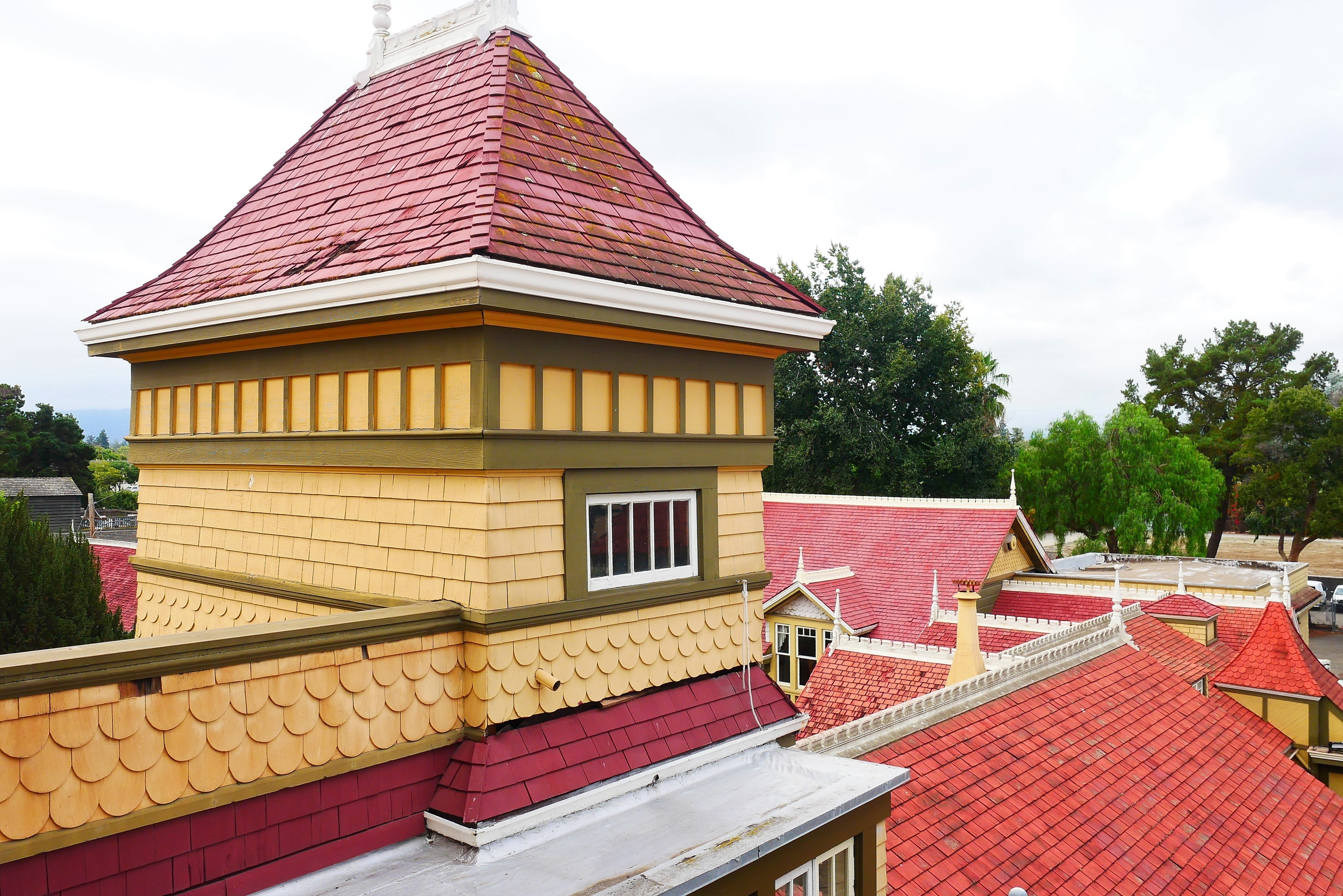
Red Roof

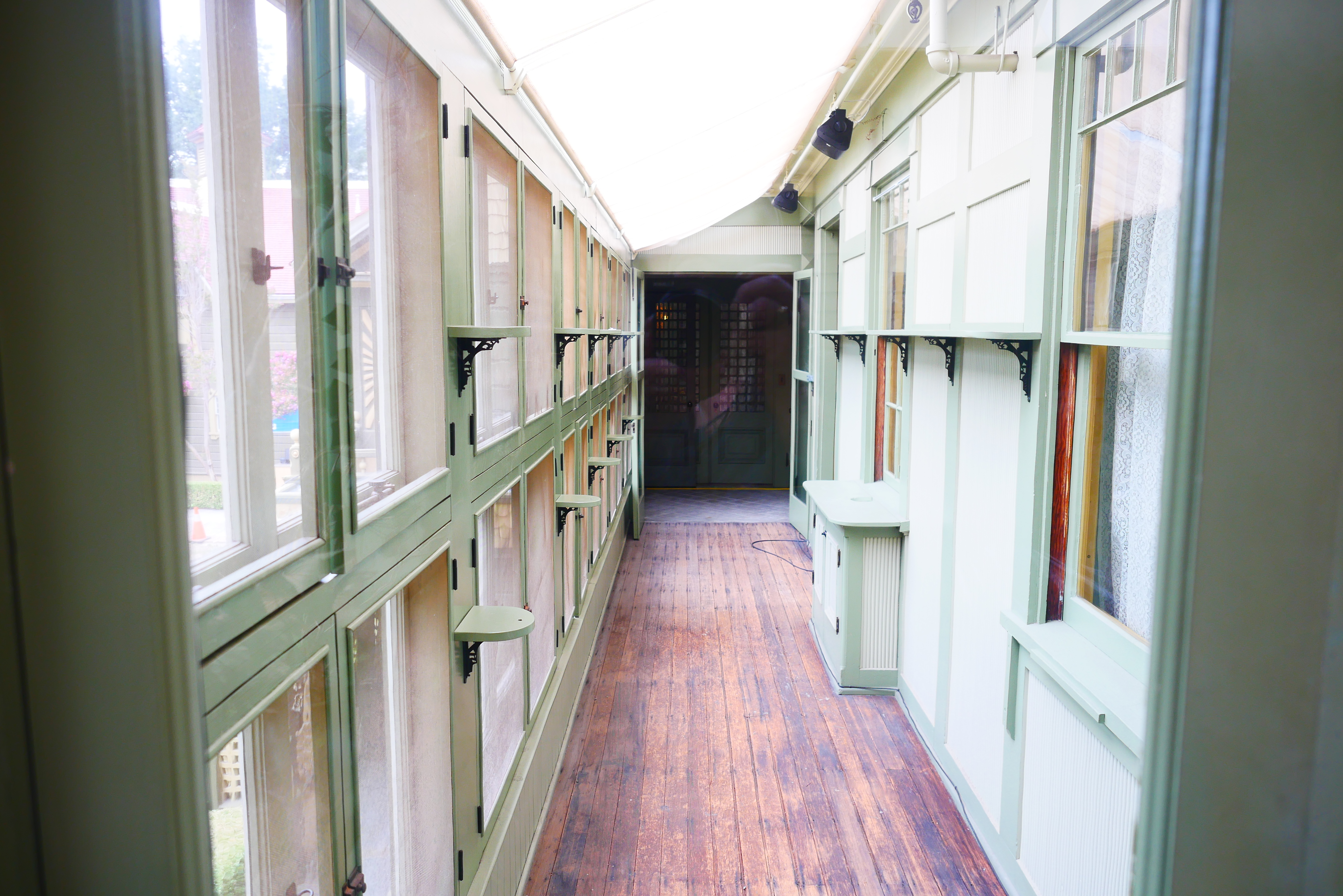
Arboretum Hallway

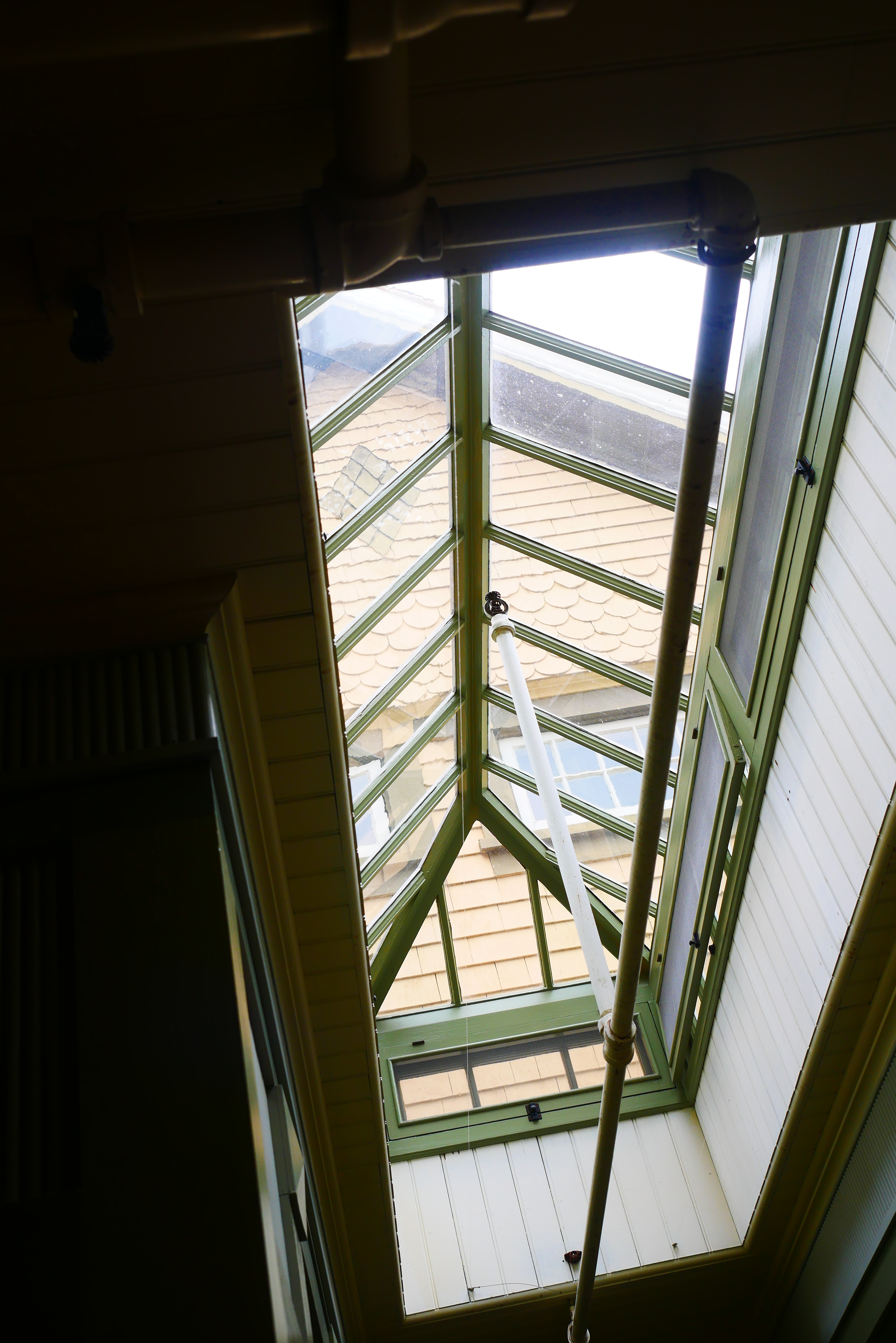
Skylight

== See also ==
- Haunting of Winchester House, a film by The Asylum loosely based on the myths surrounding the house
