= Haunting of Winchester House =

- DVD cover
- Directed by: Mark Atkins
- Written by: Jose Prendes; Mark Atkins
- Produced by: David Michael Latt; David Rimawi; Paul Bales
- Starring: Lira Kellerman; Michael Holmes; Tomas Boykin
- Cinematography: Mark Atkins
- Distributed by: The Asylum
- Release date: September 29, 2009
- Running time: 90 minutes
- Country: United States
- Language: English

Haunting of Winchester House is a 2009 supernatural horror film produced by The Asylum. The story revolves around a family that moves in as new caretakers of the Winchester Mystery House but encounter the spirits within. It utilizes a fictionalized version of the life of Sarah Winchester.

== Plot ==
A postal worker, Marlene, is delivering a package to the Winchester House. She leaves the package with the current caretaker, Jessica, who warns the postal worker to leave immediately. Later, Jessica is seen performing a ritual within a magic circle when a ghostly wind catches her and throws her out of a window into a tree, killing her.

Later, Susan, her husband Drake, and their daughter Haley agree to the open caretaker job at the Winchester Mystery House. On the way there, they nearly collide with an oncoming car and once they arrive, find their keys do not work at the gate and they must leave their car. At the house, they find instructions to pick any rooms as the caretaker's wing is “currently uninhabitable”. After getting settled, Drake is grilling outside when Harrison Dent approaches having seen their car and introduces himself as a paranormal investigator. Drake is skeptical of him and dismisses his offer to help. Later, Haley gets trapped in the basement when the door is locked from the outside. Drake blames Dent but Susan thinks it could be ghosts. An old, female spirit appears and takes Haley, so they first call the police but the line is filled with static and they are not able to communicate. They are then plagued by a series of apparitions or “Winchester Tormentors”, (victims of Winchester rifles) before two police officers, Cooper & Hunter, show up, having traced their call. Mrs. Winchester uses her ghostly wind and throws both the police off the porch, impaling them onto broken branches nearby, killing them.

Susan contacts Dent who agrees to help them. Meanwhile, Drake has been coughing up blood and believes it's related to Mr. Winchester’s death, attributed to tuberculosis but Dent disagrees. He explains the types of spirits and believes they have a poltergeist or “type two” spirit as he puts it, a spirit that knows they are dead (type one being spirits that do not know they are dead). He suggests they try to communicate with it and find out what the spirit wants. When he does, they discover the spirit wants Annie, Mrs. Winchester's daughter who supposedly went missing, so Kent believes the spirit to be Sarah Winchester. Kent attempts to call the spirit of Annie and tells them that this will also call the Tormentor spirits so he draws a magic circle to protect them. Mrs. Winchester launches him into the fireplace before he can finish the circle, killing him. Susan finishes the circle and protects herself and Drake from Mrs. Winchester, who vanishes.

A spirit of a deaf employee of Mrs. Winchester, James Clayhill, appears and lures them to the attic. Under some boxes, they find a large chest and James urges them to open it. Inside is the mummified remains of Annie. Mrs. Winchester's ghost appears but changes from demonic to angelic; Her, Annie, and James’ spirits disappear as some music is heard from inside a wall. Susan and Drake discover a crawlspace behind a thin wall leading to a sealed off room where Haley is sitting. Together, the family leaves the house and walks down the driveway. They find that their car is no longer at the gate so they walk down the road. Susan notices some tire marks at the side of the road leading into a ravine. She looks over the edge and discovers their car, crashed, with the three of them still inside, dead, revealing that when they narrowly missed the collision on the way to Winchester House, they actually drove over a ledge and died upon impact in the ravine below. Through brief flashbacks, this is shown to be the reason that the police could not hear them on the phone and why their keys to the mansion did not work. It's also revealed that Kent was trying to help the family of spirits "pass on", (them all being "type one" spirits, not knowing they had died) before he himself was killed. Instead of telling Drake and Haley this, she walks with them along the road back towards Winchester House as Drake coughs up blood.

== Cast ==
- Lira Kellerman as Susan
- Michael Holmes as Drake
- Patty Roberts (Barry Womack) as Haley
- Tomas Boykin as Harrison Dent
- David Hendrex as Ghost #2
- Sarah Hendrex as Ghost #3
- Kimberly Ables Jindra as Sarah Winchester
- George Michael Lampe as Nasty Ghost
- David McIntyre as Officer Cooper
- Rya Meyers as Marlene
- Joey Ruggles as Redneck #1
- Savannah Schoenecker as Margo Hunter
- Sari Sheehan as Jessica Lloyd
- Jennifer Smart as Annie
- Mitch Toles as Blind Ghost
- Kimberly Trew as Girlfriend
- Rob Ullett as James Clayhill
- Frank Weitzel as Gunshot Ghost
- Jefferson Wilmore as Civil War Ghost
- Gregory Paul Smith as Faceless Ghost & Redneck #2

== Production ==
The film was filmed using 3D technology.

== Release ==
The film was released "Unrated and Uncut" as a DVD premier by The Asylum Home Entertainment with certain retailers selling a 3D version of the film and holds the distinction of being The Asylum's first 3D release although the 3D aspect has been criticized. The DVD also features a "making-of featurette" and deleted scenes. It was followed by a Blu-ray release in 2010 by Echo Bridge Home Entertainment. The film was released roughly 6 months after The Haunting in Connecticut to capitalize on its release (nearly a decade before Lionsgate's Winchester), although the story in this film revolves around the Winchester Mystery House and its supposed hauntings, while the former film was based on a supposed haunted house in Connecticut investigated by Ed and Lorraine Warren.

== Reception ==
Critical reception has been negative.

Dread Central awarded the film a score of 1.5 / 5 in a mostly negative review published shortly after the film's release in 2009. The review heavily criticizes the "3D release" of the film as the copy used for the review purposes did not include 3D glasses and the retailer did not receive them with the DVD shipments. It goes on to point out that it is supposedly based on a true story yet the film fictionalizes aspects of the actual Winchester family history and has "very little in common with the facts". It also argues that the film is "almost a textbook how-to guide to haunted house clichés" due to the less than original plot and ultimately describes the "unrated and uncut" branded film like "watching a stuffy PBS production of an R.L. Stine tale". The reviewer also notes that the reverse cover on the DVD spoils the film's twist ending.
