= 32nd Lambda Literary Awards =

2020 literary awards ceremony

The 32nd Lambda Literary Awards were announced on June 1, 2020, to honour works of LGBT literature published in 2019. Due to the COVID-19 pandemic in the United States, there was no gala ceremony; instead, the winners were announced exclusively through social media and the press.

The nominees were announced in March 2020. Winners are in bold.

== Special awards ==
Category	Winner
Trustee Award	Jericho Brown
Visionary Award	Jane Wagner
Publishing Professional Award	Brian Lam
Jeanne Córdova Prize for Lesbian/Queer Nonfiction	Leah Lakshmi Piepzna-Samarasinha
Jim Duggins, PhD Outstanding Mid-Career Novelist Prize	Larissa Lai
Judith A. Markowitz Emerging Writer Award	Xandria Phillips and Calvin Gimpelevich

== Nominees and winners ==
Category	Winner	Nominated
Bisexual Fiction	**Fiona Alison Duncan, Exquisite Mariposa**	Garrett Leigh, Jude; Deborah Levy, The Man Who Saw Everything; Tomaz Moniz, Big Familia; Carley Moore, The Not Wives; Zack Smedley, Deposing Nathan; Jess Taylor, Just Pervs; Alia Trabucco Zerán, The Remainder (Sophie Hughes, tr.)
Bisexual Nonfiction	**Trisha Low, Socialist Realism**	Victoria Freeman, A World Without Martha: A Memoir of Sisters, Disability, and Difference; Janet W. Hardy, IMPERVIOUS: Confessions of a Semi-Retired Deviant
Bisexual Poetry	**Stephanie Young, Pet Sounds**	Dorothy Chan, Revenge of the Asian Woman; mai c. doan, water/tongue; Moina Pam Dick, Moira of Edges, Moira the Tart; Camonghne Felix, Build Yourself a Boat; Faylita Hicks, HoodWitch; Ariana Reines, A Sand Book; Cam Scott, Romans/Snowmare
Gay Fiction	**Bryan Washington, Lot**	Jean-Baptiste Del Amo, Animalia (Frank Wynne, tr.); Lindsey Drager, The Archive of Alternate Endings; Will Eaves, Murmur; Jaime Manrique, Like This Afternoon Forever; João Gilberto Noll, Lord (Edgar Garbelotto, tr.); Ocean Vuong, On Earth We're Briefly Gorgeous; De'Shawn Charles Winslow, In West Mills
Gay Memoir/Biography	**Saeed Jones, How We Fight for Our Lives**	Joseph Caldwell, In the Shadow of the Bridge; Siddharth Dube, An Indefinite Sentence: A Personal History of Outlawed Love and Sex; Guy Hocquenghem, The Amphitheater of the Dead (Max Fox, tr.); Isaac Mizrahi, I.M.; Alvin Orloff, DISASTERAMA! Adventures in the Queer Underground 1977-1997; James Oseland, Jimmy Neurosis; Chris Rush, The Light Years
Gay Mystery	**Michael Nava, Carved in Bone**	Michael Craft, ChoirMaster: A Mister Puss Mystery; Chris Gill, The Nowhere; Greg Herren, Royal Street Reveillon; Liam McIlvanney, The Quaker; David S. Pederson, Death Takes a Bow; Timothy Jay Smith, The Fourth Courier; Marshall Thornton, Rewind
Gay Poetry	**Cyrée Jarelle Johnson, Slingshot**	Billy-Ray Belcourt, NDN Coping Mechanisms: Notes from the Field; Jericho Brown, The Tradition; Douglas Crane, The Revisionist & The Astropastorals; Lawrence Lacambra Ypil, The Experiment of the Tropics; Gabriel Ojeda-Sagué, Losing Miami; Jake Skeets, Eyes Bottle Dark with a Mouthful of Flowers; Brian Teare, Doomstead Days
Gay Romance	**James Lovejoy, Joseph Chapman: My Molly Life**	Bryan T. Clark, Escaping Camp Roosevelt; Chris Delyani, Best Man; Jay Hogan, Digging Deep; Garrett Leigh, Kiss Me Again; Rick R. Reed, Blue Umbrella Sky; R. A. Thorn, My Baby Chased Away the Blues; Marshall Thornton, Code Name: Liberty
Lesbian Fiction	**Nicole Dennis-Benn, Patsy**	Kristen Arnett, Mostly Dead Things; Beth Brant, A Generous Spirit: Selected Work by Beth Brant (Janice Gould, ed.); Carolina de Robertas, Cantoras; Madeline Ffitch, Stay and Fight; Shannon Pufahl, On Swift Horses; Mathangi Subramanian, A People's History of Heaven; Jacqueline Woodson, Red at the Bone
Lesbian Memoir/Biography	**Samra Habib, We Have Always Been Here: A Queer Muslim Memoir**	Elissa Altman, Motherland: A Memoir of Love, Loathing, and Longing; Jaquira Díaz, Ordinary Girls; Julia Koets, The Rib Joint: A Memoir in Essays; Saidiya Hartman, Wayward Lives, Beautiful Experiments: Intimate Histories of Social Upheaval; T. Kira Madden, Long Live the Tribe of Fatherless Girls; Benjamin Moser, Sontag: Her Life and Work; Edie Windsor and Joshua Lyon, A Wild and Precious Life
Lesbian Mystery	**Ann McMan, Galileo**	Amelia Ellis, The Mirror of Muraro; Ellen Hart, Twisted at the Root: A Jane Lawless Mystery; Catherine Maiorisi, The Blood Runs Cold; Claire O'Dell, The Hound of Justice
Lesbian Poetry	**t'ai freedom ford, & more black**	Etel Adnan, Time; Rocío Carlos, (the other house); Franny Choi, Soft Science; Shira Erlichman, Odes to Lithium; Gala Mukomolova, Without Protection; Lee Ann Roripaugh, tsunami vs. the fukushima 50; Sharanpal Ruprai, Pressure Cooker Love Bomb
Lesbian Romance	**Emily Noon, Aurora's Angel**	Alyssa Cole, Once Ghosted, Twice Shy; Donna K. Ford, Tennessee Whiskey; Virginia Hale, The Secret Chord; Jae, The Roommate Arrangement; M. Ullrich, Pretending in Paradise; M. Ullrich, Top of Her Game; Erin Zak, Create a Life to Love
LGBTQ Anthology	**Aishah Shahidah Simmons, Love WITH Accountability: Digging up the Roots of Child Sexual Abuse**; **Noam Sienna, A Rainbow Thread: An Anthology of Queer Jewish Texts from the First Century to 1969**	Fatimah Asghar and Safia Elhillo, The BreakBeat Poets Volume 3: Halal if You Hear Me; Amber Dawn and Justin Ducharme, Hustling Verse: An Anthology of Sex Workers' Poetry; Luiza Flynn-Goodlett, Foglifter Volume 4 Issue 2; The Other Foundation, The Heart of the Matter: The Gerald Kraak Anthology; Jeff Mann and Julia Watts, LGBTQ Fiction and Poetry from Appalachia; Micah Rajunov and Scott Duane, Nonbinary: Memoirs of Gender and Identity
LGBTQ Children's/Young Adult	**Lisa Jenn Bigelow, Hazel's Theory of Evolution**; **Alexandra Villasante, The Grief Keeper**	Jaye Robin Brown, The Meaning of Birds; Akwaeke Emezi, Pet; Nicole Melleby, Hurricane Season; Saundra Mitchell, All the Things We Do in the Dark; Rory Power, Wilder Girls; Robin Stevenson, Pride Colors
LGBTQ Drama	**Michael R. Jackson, A Strange Loop**	Liza Birkenmeier, Dr. Ride's American Beach House; Jordan Harrison, The Amateurs
LGBTQ Erotica	**L. A. Warman, Whore Foods**	Rosalind Chase, Lot's Wife; Thomas Kearnes, Texas Crude; Vikram Kolmannskog, Lord of the Senses; Gary Garth McCann, The Shape of the Earth
LGBTQ Graphic Novel	**Kelsey Wroten, Cannonball**	Jaime Hernandez, Is This How You See Me?; Vivek Shraya, Death Threat; Mariko Tamaki, Laura Dean Keeps Breaking Up With Me; Tillie Walden, Are You Listening?
LGBTQ Nonfiction	**Carmen Maria Machado, In the Dream House**	W. Ian Bourland, Bloodflowers: Rotimi Fani-Kayode, Photography, and the 1980s; Cyrus Grace Dunham, A Year Without a Name; E. Patrick Johnson, Honeypot: Black Southern Women Who Love Women; Brett Krutzsch, Dying to Be Normal: Gay Martyrs and the Transformation of American Sexual Politics; Hugh Ryan, When Brooklyn Was Queer; Karen Tongson, Why Karen Carpenter Matters; Selby Wynn Schwartz, The Bodies of Others: Drag Dances and Their Afterlives
LGBTQ Science Fiction/Fantasy/Horror	**Rivers Solomon, Daveed Diggs, William Hutson and Jonathan Snipes, The Deep**	Matthew Bright, Stories to Sing in the Dark; Julie C. Day, The Rampant; Craig Laurance Gidney, A Spectral Hue; Marlon James, Black Leopard, Red Wolf; Jac Jemc, False Bingo; Nina MacLaughlin, Wake, Siren; Samantha Shannon, The Priory of the Orange Tree
LGBTQ Studies	**Emily L. Thuma, All Our Trials: Prisons, Policing, and the Feminist Fight to End Violence**	R. L. Cagle, Scorpio Rising: A Queer Film Classic; Jian Neo Chen, Trans Exploits: Trans of Color Cultures and Technologies in Movement; Elizabeth Freeman, Beside You in Time: Sense Methods and Queer Sociabilities in the American Nineteenth Century; Robb Hernández, Archiving an Epidemic: Art, AIDS, and the Queer Chicanx Avant-Garde; Kara Keeling, Queer Times, Black Futures; Dana Seitler, Reading Sideways: The Queer Politics of Art in Modern American Fiction; Roberto Strongman, Queering Black Atlantic Religions: Transcorporeality in Candomblé, Santería and Vodou
Transgender Fiction	**Hazel Jane Plante, Little Blue Encyclopedia (for Vivian)**	M. Z. McDonnell, Poet, Prophet, Fox: The Tale of Sinnach the Seer; Bones McKay, Honey Walls; Rachel Pollack, The Beatrix Gates; Bogi Takács, The Trans Space Octopus Congregation
Transgender Nonfiction	**Ellis Martin and Zach Ozma, We Both Laughed in Pleasure: The Selected Diaries of Lou Sullivan**	Samantha Leigh Allen, Real Queer America: LGBT Stories from Red States; T. Fleischmann, Time Is the Thing a Body Moves Through; S. J. Langer, Theorizing Transgender Identity for Clinical Practice: A New Model for Understanding Gender; Andrea Long Chu, Females
Transgender Poetry	**Xandria Phillips, Hull**	Andrea Abi-Karam, Extratransmission; Samuel Ace, Our Weather Our Sea; Cameron Awkward-Rich, Dispatch; Yanyi, The Year of Blue Water
