= Woodworking (novel) =

2025 novel by Emily St. James

- First edition
- Author: Emily St. James
- Language: English
- Genre: Literary fiction
- Publisher: Crooked Media Reads; Zando
- Publication date: March 4, 2025
- Publication place: U.S.
- Media type: Print, ebook, audiobook
- Pages: 368
- ISBN: 978-1638931478

Woodworking is the 2025 debut novel of American writer Emily St. James. It was a finalist for the 2026 Edmund White Award for Debut Fiction and the 2026 Lambda Literary Award for Transgender Fiction.

== Plot ==
The novel is set in late 2016, centering on Erica Skyberg, a high school English teacher in Mitchell, South Dakota, and Abigail Hawkes, a student who has just transferred there. Chapters mainly alternate between Erica and Abigail's perspectives, written in third-person for Erica and first-person for Abigail.

Erica is a closeted trans woman who does not know of any other trans women in her community. When she learns about Abigail, and that she is trans and has been sent to detention for swearing at the students in her class for being fascist, Erica arranges to cover Abigail's detention period. Erica tells Abigail about her own identity and asks Abigail for advice. Over time, Abigail reluctantly supports Erica as she debates about coming out, while Erica feels guilty for needing Abigail's support. Erica remains scared to come out, frustrating Abigail.

Erica is friends with Brooke Daniels, a rich conservative who runs a local community theater group with her. Together, they co-direct a local production of Our Town, starring Erica's ex-wife Constance. Erica still loves Constance, but Constance is now pregnant by her new boyfriend, and debating whether to get an abortion. Constance's boyfriend seems to get along okay with Erica but supports Trump's 2016 presidential campaign. A transphobic local preacher, Isaiah Rose, is also running for a South Dakota senate seat. His campaign is well-funded by wealthy residents of Mitchell.

Abigail is searching for the ability to disappear from the transphobic notice of her classmates and the town, a move she calls "woodworking". She has been kicked out of her parents' house and lives with her older sister. Although Abigail projects a tough exterior, she also longs to be accepted by her mother, even as she avoids her mother's attempts at reconnection. Abigail begins dating Caleb, a popular boy who is Brooke's son. Abigail works hard to maintain Caleb's attention. At the same time, Brooke becomes visibly fascinated by Abigail.

As Abigail provides advice for Erica, the two gradually become friends, and Abigail realizes that she needs Erica's support too. Abigail volunteers for Helen Swee, Rose's democratic opponent, who is an ally to Erica and Abigail. At the same time, Abigail is targeted by the transphobic Rose. Rose's prominence scares Erica, who is worried about being outed and losing her teaching job. Erica and Abigail's friendship also begins to draw other people's suspicions, and Erica fears that it will be misconstrued. Their friendship withers when Abigail feels unsupported in facing transphobia and Erica withdraws into the closet. In a moment of vulnerability, Erica comes out to Constance.

Brooke's family helps fund Rose's political campaign. In a plot twist narrated in the second person, Brooke reveals that she is a trans woman who has been in the closet for decades. She has already had gender-affirming surgery, and her politically active husband paid people to keep this quiet. Brooke eventually shares her identity and Abigail struggles to rectify how she could have supported conservative transphobia while being trans herself. By the end of the book, Constance and Erica decide to change careers. Erica and Abigail also each plan to leave the town.

== Creation ==
St. James wrote the story as a mother-daughter story, basing it on her observation that "newly out queer people frequently turn for advice to much younger queer people, who’ve nevertheless been out longer." Part of St. James's motivation for writing the book was to prove that trans people live in rural areas and have existed throughout humanity's history in different settings. She also wanted to write about found family, extending it to the extreme case of knowing of almost no other queer people.

In the first draft of Woodworking, Erica's deadname was always written out, but in later drafts, St. James redacted the name. She wanted to avoid a pet peeve about transition narratives, where using two names for a trans character makes them feel like two different characters. She appreciated that the redaction box was jarring for readers of the text, and agreed with the book's designer on making the box slightly gray to evoke fog, in a nod to Erica's assertion that her "old name had come to sound like it was enveloped in fog".

St. James wrote the final draft of Woodworking while writing for Yellowjackets, writing her novel in the mornings and working on the show in the afternoons. She believes this interplay darkened some parts of Woodworking. Overall, St. James characterizes the book as a comedy.

St. James decided to write Abigail from the first person present and Erica from the third person. She described this as a reflection of the types of novels each inhabited: Abigail living a YA novel and Erica a work of literary fiction. Wondering what purpose a second-person voice would fit in the novel led St. James to add one character's second-person narrative, and also led to the work's title. St. James later realized that the first and third-person voices let her show dissociation in different ways, with first person evoking a "traumatized tunnel vision" and third-person showing "life lived in a dissociative cocoon".

=== Influences ===
St. James credited Little Blue Encyclopedia (for Vivian) by Hazel Jane Plante as her first literary inspiration for writing Woodworking. The works of Gretchen Felker-Martin and Alison Rumfitt were influences on the characterization of Abigail. Her voice was also inspired by the protagonist of Imogen Binnie's Nevada, which St. James describes as a foundational text in the genre of trans literature, as well as a great American novel. St. James also watched makeup tutorials on YouTube to get more exposure to the self-expression of modern teenagers, and tried to write referencing social media platforms that she was familiar enough with to write believably.

Upper Midwestern literature also influenced the novel, especially Sinclair Lewis's Main Street. Detransition, Baby, by Torrey Peters, affected how St. James wrote about the Midwest. St. James also cited Harrow the Ninth, by Tamsyn Muir, as a strong influence on the narrative voices used in the novel.

== Reception ==
Woodworking was a finalist for the 2026 Edmund White Award for Debut Fiction. It was also a finalist for the 2026 Lambda Literary Award for Transgender Fiction. It was shortlisted with distinction for The Transfeminine Review's 2025 Reader's Choice Awards in the category of Best Transfeminine Fiction. Librarians from the Brooklyn Public Library named it as one of their 100 favorite books of 2025, praising its "messy" and authentic characters.

Kirkus Reviews and Publishers Weekly gave Woodworking starred reviews. Laura Sackton, writing for Book Riot, praised the book as one of her top three reads of the year thus far. Christ, for Electric Literature, characterized St. James's writing as having "undeniable wit and a wealth of empathy". Bethany Karsten, for The Transfeminine Review, rated the book at eight stars out of ten. Lori Marso, for the Los Angeles Review of Books, says the writing is sometimes odd, but praised the book's authenticity, depiction of place and characterization of feeling out of place while growing up in the Midwest. Kayleigh Donaldson, for Paste, also praised St. James's authentic depiction of the book's small-town setting and its community.

== See also ==
- Bellies
- A/S/L
- Girlmode
- Manhunt
- The Job
