= LGBTQ themes in horror fiction =

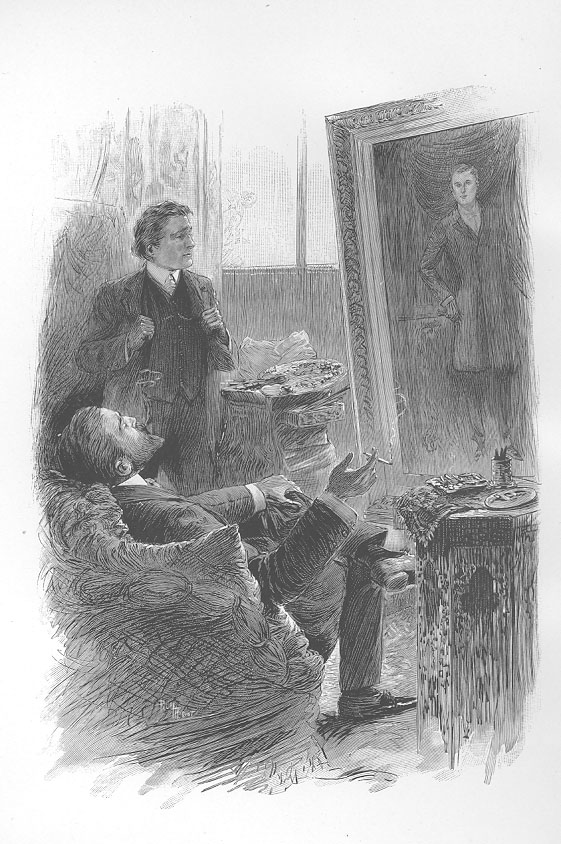
Illustration of painter Basil Hallward and aristocrat Lord Henry Wotton observing the picture of Dorian Gray.

LGBTQ themes in horror fiction refers to sexuality in horror fiction that can often focus on LGBTQ characters and themes within various forms of media. It may deal with characters who are coded as or who are openly LGBTQ, or it may deal with themes or plots that are specific to gender and sexual minorities.

Depending on when it was made, it may contain open statements of gender variance, sexuality, same-sex sexual imagery, same-sex love or affection or simply a sensibility that has special meaning to LGBTQ people.

== History ==
=== Overview and origins ===
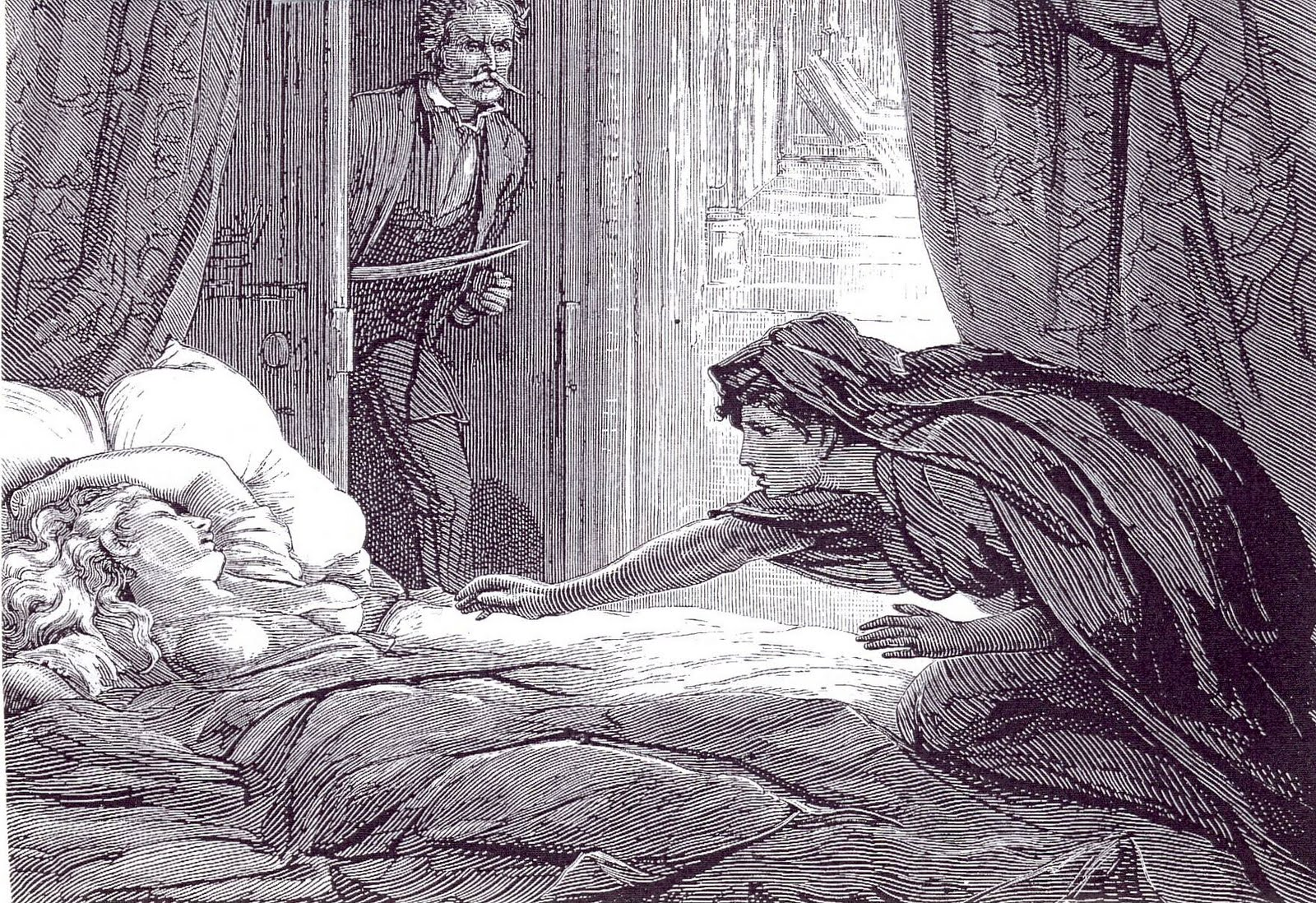
Illustration by D. H. Friston from the first publication of the lesbian vampire novella Carmilla (1872) by Sheridan Le Fanu

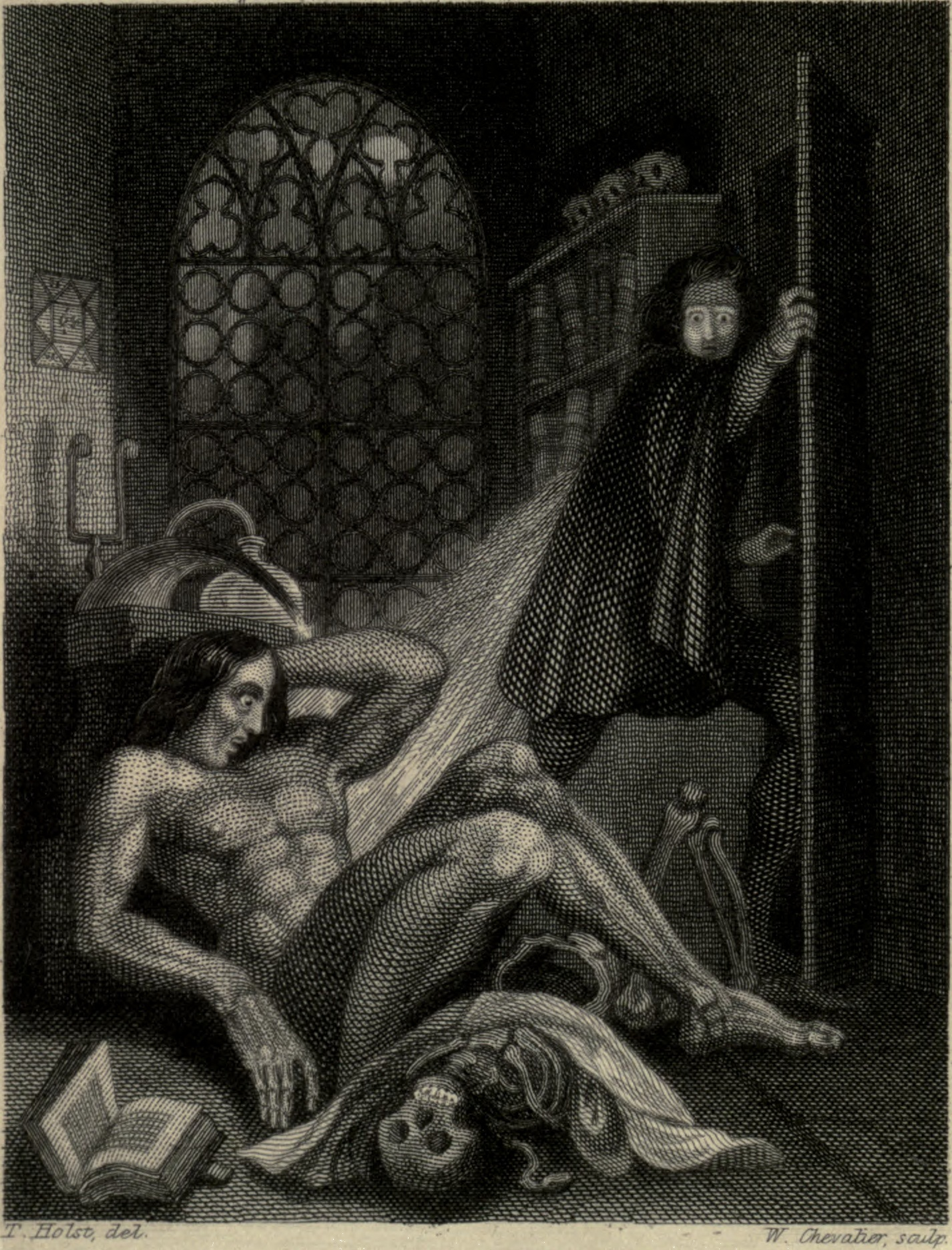
Illustration from the inside cover of Frankenstein, or the Modern Prometheus (Revised Edition, 1831).

The relation between LGBTQ fiction and horror is often attributed to the Gothic novels of the 1790s and early 1800s. Many Gothic authors, like Matthew Lewis, William Thomas Beckford, and Francis Lathom, were homosexual. LGBTQ horror publisher and general editor James Jenkins offered that "the traditional explanation for the gay/horror connection is that it was impossible for them to write openly about gay themes back then (or even perhaps express them, since words like 'gay' and 'homosexual' didn't exist), so they sublimated them and expressed them in more acceptable forms, using the medium of a transgressive genre like horror fiction." Early works with clear gay subtext include Lewis's The Monk (1796) and both Charles Maturin's The Fatal Revenge (1807) and Melmoth the Wanderer (1820). Influential and controversial entries in the genre include the lesbian vampire novella Carmilla (1872) by Sheridan Le Fanu and The Picture of Dorian Gray (1890) by Oscar Wilde, which shocked readers with its sensuality and overtly homosexual characters. Jenkins also points out what he sees as gay subtext in Bram Stoker's Dracula (1897), as the titular character wards off other female vampires and claims Jonathan Harker, stating "This man belongs to me!" Richard S. Primuth of The Gay & Lesbian Review Worldwide writes that Stoker, a closeted gay man and close friend of Oscar Wilde, began writing Dracula just as Wilde was sentenced to hard labor after his conviction for gross indecency. Talia Schaffer writes in ELH that "Dracula explores Stoker's fear and anxiety as a closeted homosexual man during Oscar Wilde's trial... This peculiar tonality of horror derives from Stoker's emotions at this unique moment in gay history."

In the following century, the control of the book industry by larger publishers made it difficult to distribute the increasingly overt gay content being produced. Queer horror got a boost with the advent of the pulp novel in the 20th century, a cheap way to manufacture paperback novels that became popularized during World War II. Three on a Broomstick (1967) by Don Holliday is an early example of the gay horror pulp.

== Themes ==
=== Vampirism and homosexual desire ===
Author James R. Keller writes that in particular, "Gay and lesbian readers have been quick to identify with the representation of the vampire, suggesting its experiences parallel those of the sexual outsider." Richard Dyer discusses the recurring homoerotic motifs of vampire fiction in his article "Children of the Night", primarily "the necessity of secrecy, the persistence of a forbidden passion, and the fear of discovery." With the vampire having been a recurring metaphor for same-sex desire from before Stoker's Dracula, Dyer observes that historically earlier representations of vampires tend to evoke horror and later ones turn that horror into celebration. The homoerotic overtones of Anne Rice's celebrated The Vampire Chronicles series (1976–2018) are well-documented, and its publication reinforced the "widely recognized parallel between the queer and the vampire."

=== Frankenstein and gender ===
Gender studies scholar Judith Butler asserts that Frankenstein's creature exists in a gray area of gender, tying his monstrosity to his subversion of gendered expectations. Professor of English Jolene Zigarovich expands Butler's somewhat binary lens, bringing in Susan Stryker's explicitly transgender analysis of the creature. Stryker likens the creature's construction with the process of medically transitioning, and draws parallels between the subsequent ostracism the creature faced with experience of marginalization experienced by transgender individuals. Zigarovich credits Stryker's work as a catalyst for subsequent queer and trans approaches to Gothic literary analysis, particularly amongst those seeking to reappropriate the maligned imagery of the "unnatural" and variant with regards to gender.

=== Lycanthropy and queer identity ===
The werewolf serves as a metaphor for queer identities in how it navigates the necessity to hide one’s identity and social rejection.

== Contemporary horror fiction with LGBT themes ==
A plethora of more recent horror fiction includes LGBTQ themes, as the genre's focus on the body, desire, and fear places it in a prime position to tackle issues of normativity and social identity. José Luis Zárate's The Route of Ice and Salt, a groundbreaking 1998 retelling of the voyage of the Demeter in Dracula, brings the subtextual queerness of the novel to the surface by making such themes explicit in his depiction of the ship's captain as gay. Author Billy Martin's horror novels of the 1990's and 2000's are known for featuring gay male characters, as he incorporates his own experiences as a gay trans man into the themes of his work. Emily Danforth's 2020 novel Plain Bad Heroines is a gothic story led entirely by queer female main characters, and references numerous other works of horror fiction. T. Kingfisher's 2022 novella What Moves The Dead is a retelling of Edgar Allan Poe's The Fall of the House of Usher with a non-binary protagonist. Lee Mandelo's 2021 debut novel Summer Sons explores gender identity and queerness in the subgenre of Southern Gothic, as does his 2024 novella The Woods All Black.

=== Transgender body horror ===
There have been many recent commercially successful novels that center body horror as an allegory or expansion on ideas of bodily dysphoria and transphobia, like 2022's Hell Followed with Us. Gretchen Felker-Martin's Manhunt received critical praise for her 'gory' and brutal' debut novel. Liam McBain of NPR wrote, "Manhunt is a paragon of body horror...it's obvious the point Felker-Martin is making with the Legion: While everything is heightened within the apocalyptic setting, enforcing gender kills people, That's true today; Manhunt just takes it to an extreme." Alison Rumfitt's 2021 debut novel Tell Me I'm Worthless is a gothic twist on the horrors of marginalization, told from the perspective of a trans woman and her transphobic former friend.

Author Jude Ellison S. Doyle, in It Came from the Closet: Queer Reflections on Horror, drew a connection between traditional body horror depictions, which capitalize on a fear of feminine sexuality, and anti-transition rhetoric, which frames medical transition as a form of bodily mutilation. He emphasized that he hoped to see more mainstream body horror written from non-cis perspectives, writing

There is a difference between feeling uncomfortable with your own body and having others proclaim how uncomfortable they are with you, between the horror felt by a person and the horror caused by a monster.

=== Novels with unintentional LGBT theming ===
Thomas Harris' The Silence of the Lambs follows the investigation surrounding serial killer Buffalo Bill, who claims to be a transsexual woman. Transness is not one of the novel's main themes, and a physician in the book clarified that the character is not actually transgender, simply mentally ill. However, after the novel was adapted to film, there was extensive criticism of the portrayal as being damaging to the public perception of transgender people.

== Awards ==
- The Queer Horror Awards (1998–2007) honored works that involved significant, and generally positive, portrayal of gay, lesbian, bisexual or transgender characters, issues or themes within the area of horror.
- The Lambda Literary Award includes an award for Science Fiction/Fantasy/Horror.
- The Gaylactic Spectrum Awards honor works in science fiction, fantasy and horror which include positive explorations of gay, lesbian, bisexual or transgender characters, themes, or issues.

== See also ==
- LGBTQ literature
- LGBTQ culture
- LGBTQ themes in speculative fiction
- List of horror television series with LGBT characters
- List of lesbian, gay, bisexual or transgender-related films
- Lists of television programs with LGBT characters
- Gaylaxicon
- The Babadook as a gay icon
- Queer vampires
