= The Wachowskis' unrealized projects =

American filmmakers the Wachowskis have worked on a number of projects which never progressed beyond the pre-production stage under their direction. Some of these projects fell into development hell and are presumably or were cancelled.

== 1990s ==
=== Plastic Man ===
In 1995, the Wachowskis wrote a script for a film adaptation of the Plastic Man comic book series. The film was planned to be developed by Warner Bros. However, for unknown reasons, the film was never made. The script was leaked online by Yahoo! Movies columnist and reader Greg Dean Schmitz in June 2003, one month after the release of The Matrix Reloaded.

=== Vertical Run ===
Around 1996, the Wachowskis wrote a script for a film adaptation of Joseph R. Garber's thriller Vertical Run. However, the film went unproduced.

=== Carnivore ===
This was the first film script written by the Wachowskis. It has been described as "a Corman-style, low-budget horror movie that dealt with cannibalism or, more specifically, millionaires being eaten by cannibals". The writing was well-received and the script made the duo minded, although interest in making the film was low as executives told them "This is a bad idea. I can't make this. I'm rich." On April 6, 1999, a week after The Matrix opened in theaters, Variety reported that Trimark was considering purchase of the script and that they were in talks with George A. Romero to direct it with production slated to begin in August. In April 2001, it was reported that the Wachowskis were producing it for Lionsgate and looking for a director surfaced again (meaning Romero's departure from the project), and in August 2003 a second time, with their go-to cinematographer Bill Pope supposed to be making his directorial debut with it.

=== Hard Boiled ===
On August 22, 1999, five months after the release of The Matrix, it was reported that the Wachowskis were considering an animated film adaptation of the Hard Boiled comic book series, in which Geof Darrow, the conceptional designer of The Matrix trilogy, participated as cartoonist. However, Bleeding Cool later reported that the project was cancelled due to the fact that the Hard Boiled creator Frank Miller did not want to see his creation as an animated film.

== 2000s ==
=== King Conan: Crown of Iron ===
On November 6, 2000, Variety reported that the Wachowskis were working with Warner Bros. to make a film reboot of Conan the Barbarian, due to the unsuccessful reception of Conan the Destroyer. The Wachowskis originally attempted to film The Matrix Reloaded and The Matrix Revolutions and work on this film at the same time, On January 20, 2004, however, via IGN, Lilly Wachowski reported that the film entitled King Conan: Crown of Iron was stalled for years due to her and her sister Lana's lack of interest after finishing the filming of The Matrix sequels, although Lana and Lilly stated that Conan the Barbarian was their favorite movie based on comics.

=== Batman: Year One ===
Around 2000, while Darren Aronofsky and Frank Miller worked on their own film adaptation of Miller's Batman: Year One, Warner Bros. lured the Wachowskis to the project after the success of The Matrix, leading them to write their own take of Year One. In contrast to the screenplay written by Aronofsky and Miller, the Wachowskis' proposal was more faithful to the original comic and Warner was pleased with it. Their ideas for the film would have been making a live-action adaptation of the comic books greatly influenced by the Neal Adams Batman era with an isolated and maniacal Bruce Wayne, an emphasis on the "detective aspect" of the Batman persona and a fluid and violent plot with loads of action, confrontations and the usual Batman stories three-act plot. Reportedly, the Wachowskis loved the concept, but they had felt so appalled with Joel Schumacher's Batman & Robin that they were afraid of following up that adaptation. In the end, the Wachowskis preferred to continue their work with The Matrix trilogy after The Matrix Reloaded and The Matrix Revolutions were greenlighted, figuring that their own "comic book franchise" was better and original than the deal Warner was offering, and politely declined the offer.

=== Shaolin Cowboy and the Tomb of Doom ===
In 2008, the Wachowskis were reported of being working with Madhouse to make an animated film adaptation of the Shaolin Cowboy comic book series. The film's title was eventually revealed as Shaolin Cowboy and the Tomb of Doom. Darrow and Japanese director Seiji Mizushima were attached to direct the film. However, according to Darrow, the film's production was left unfinished due to a lack of money.

=== Speed Racer 2 ===
Before the release of Speed Racer, Variety stated that a sequel to the film could happen if the film had a good box office performance. In 2008, a possible sequel was contemplated by the Wachowskis when Rain asked them why his character was so happy that Speed won; they replied it could be explained in the next film. Rain said he was hired for three years, while noting that did not guarantee a sequel would be released. Christina Ricci also considered it a possibility; she stated "When we [the cast] were all leaving, we were like 'write the sequel!' 'We want to come back'. And they [the Wachowskis] were like, 'I know. I know. We're going to. Don't worry'", adding she would like more action scenes for her character. The producer Joel Silver said that the Wachowskis "have a great story idea for a sequel" but that it is "a great idea for a sequel if it makes sense to make it."

=== Cobalt Neural 9 ===
In December 2009, Arianna Huffington tweeted pictures of herself on the set of "a The Wachowskis movie on Iraq from the perspective of the future". CHUD.com reported what the Wachowskis were doing was camera tests and shooting of test footage on the Red digital camera for a future movie, but not shooting the movie itself. In March 2010, Jesse Ventura said he had also shot for the project right before Huffington. Both of them were dressed as people from roughly 100 years in the future and they were asked to improvise without a script about the Iraq War. In May 2010, Deadline reported the movie was going to be a hard-R story that would begin in the future but move back to the then-current war in Iraq and center on the homosexual relationship between an American soldier and an Iraqi. The Wachowskis completed the script and were searching for funding to direct it. In July 2010, the movie was reported to have begun casting under the codename CN9 (or CN-9), and in August 2010 the full name was revealed as Cobalt Neural 9. In September 2010, Vulture posted additional details about the script and revealed the movie would be told in found footage-style from the perspective of digital archaeologists from the future. An estimated $20 million budget was reported although they were told a studio would "never, ever" finance it but perhaps the Wachowskis could do it themselves. In December 2010, The Hollywood Reporter reported that Salman Rushdie and Cornel West had also shot talking head sequences along with the previously reported involvement of Huffington and Ventura but the Wachowskis were currently looking into other movies because of troubles financing it. Later, in September 2012, Aleksandar Hemon wrote about the making of Cloud Atlas and recalled he too was one of the people the Wachowskis had invited to interview in December 2009, to help inspire the script of Cobalt Neural 9. The last update on the film was in October 2012, when the Wachowskis were asked about it and they responded they were still keen to make it, because they had invested both financially ($5 million) and emotionally into it, even if that ends up being in a different form than film.

== 2010s ==
=== Hood ===
In December 2010, The Hollywood Reporter wrote that the Wachowskis were planning to direct for Warner Bros. a script of theirs called Hood, which was a modern adaptation of the Robin Hood legend. The Wachowskis were said to be reaching out to actors, including Will Smith.

== 2020s ==
=== Trash Mountain ===
In February 2024, Lilly was announced by Collider to solo-direct Trash Mountain, a film about a young gay man from Chicago returning to his rural Missouri to deal with his father's hoarder state after the latter's death. It was to star Caleb Hearon, written by Hearon and Ruby Caster and produced by Colin Trevorrow, Eddie Vaisman and Julia Lebedev. By October 2025, Kris Swanberg replaced Wachowski as director, before filming commenced.

=== The Hunted ===
In an October 2024 interview for Autostraddle, Lilly revealed that she had just written a script with her partner Mickey Ray Mahoney called The Hunted as "a response to all of the horrible anti-trans stuff that's going on in the world. What if trans people could form this almost weather underground level of resistance? It becomes a murder mystery that goes up the ladder into the furthest reaches of government." In August 2026, Lilly stated that producers were reluctant to finance the film, which has an estimated production budget of $10 million, due to its "wall-to-wall trans cast", and that she was seeking alternative avenues to develop and release the project. Live table reads of the screenplay took place on August 7 and 8, at Dynasty Typewriter Theatre.

=== Manhunt ===
In the same Autostraddle interview, Lilly stated that she was involved in an adaptation of Gretchen Felker-Martin's Manhunt. In May 2026, Felker-Martin stated that the adaptation was no longer being developed.

=== Confessions ===
In addition to Manhunt, Lilly was involved in a film adaptation of Jordy Rosenberg's Confessions of the Fox.

=== Cosmoknights ===
Also in October 2024, Lilly was trying to do an adaption of the comic book Cosmoknights in collaboration with Emily Andras.
