= Little Blue Encyclopedia (for Vivian) =

2019 novel by Hazel Jane Plante

- Author: Hazel Jane Plante
- Genre: Literary fiction, Transgender literature
- Publisher: Metonymy Press
- Publication date: October 2019
- Pages: 200
- ISBN: 978-0-99404-719-9

Little Blue Encyclopedia (for Vivian) is the 2019 debut novel of Hazel Jane Plante. It won the 2020 Lambda Literary Award for Transgender Fiction, and was shortlisted for the 2020 Leslie Feinberg Award and Jim Deva Prize.

== Plot ==
The novel takes the form of an encyclopedia draft about a fictional television show, Little Blue. According to the book, Little Blue was an eccentric show, with a short and dramatic 2001 run that made it a cult hit. The book records details about the show in entries from A to Z, beginning with the character Captain Alphonse, illustrated with an armadillo, and ending with Lucas Zito and a sketch of the magazine Slippery City. Within these entries, the encyclopedia's creator shares more about her own life. The narrator's best friend, Vivian, loved Little Blue. Vivian recently died, and the narrator writes entries about the show's characters to pay tribute to Vivian and work through her grief. Both the narrator and Vivian were trans women, and the narrator credits Vivian with helping her through her difficult transition. The narrator also had an unrequited love for Vivian, who was straight. As the narrator writes the encyclopedia, she feels more able to share the joy of knowing Vivian rather than focusing on her death.

== Creation ==
Hazel Jane Plante wrote Little Blue Encyclopedia (for Vivian) over the course of nine years. In a 2019 interview, she stated that she enjoyed playing with the form of her writing and liked the challenge of making a novel via an encyclopedia about a fictional television show. She had started with the intention to make a short book about a fictional television show, inspired by works from BFI or 33 1/3. She combined this project with another where she was writing about a relationship between trans women.

== Publication ==
Little Blue Encyclopedia (for Vivian) was published by Metonymy Press in October 2019.

== Reception ==
Little Blue Encyclopedia (for Vivian) won the 2020 Lambda Literary Award for Transgender Fiction. It was a finalist for the 2020 Leslie Feinberg Award for Trans and Gender-Variant Literature. It was also shortlisted for the inaugural Jim Deva Prize for Writing that Provokes.

The book received overwhelmingly positive reviews. Quill & Quire gave it a starred review and praised its originality and power. The review noted the book's optimism even as the narrative circled through grief. Jacob Wren, reviewing for the Montreal Review of Books, wrote about his love for the book and the times it made him cry. He called it a strange but wonderful book, where the encyclopedic entries share a detailed view of the relationship between the two women at its heart. Yu-Sen Zhou, for Room Magazine, says that the book "makes the brutal tender" by gradually sharing the central relationship with readers as we follow the narrator's spiral through grief. Brett Josef Grubisic, reviewing for the Vancouver Sun, concludes that the book guides us "to a place where love, loss, and melancholy intermingle with gratitude, remembrance, and celebration." Drew Broussard recommended the book for Literary Hub as one of their favorite books and one that epitomized what small presses can share.

=== Influence ===
According to Emily St. James, Little Blue Encyclopedia (for Vivian) and Imogen Binnie's Nevada were the two biggest influences on her novel Woodworking. Soula Emmanuel, author of Wild Geese, was also influenced by Little Blue Encyclopedia (for Vivian), calling it her favorite trans novel in 2024.
