= Queer vampires =

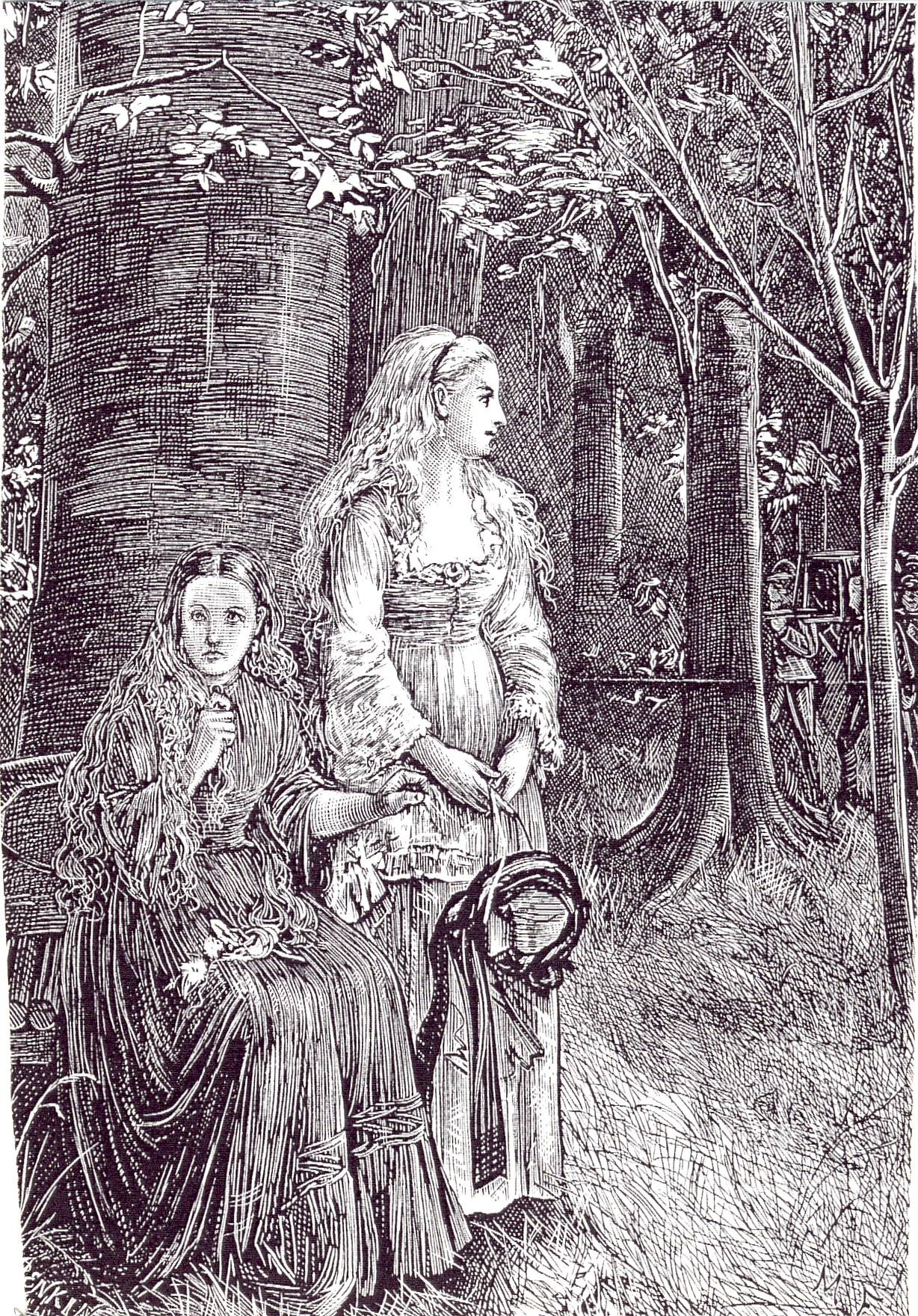
Illustration by Michael Fitzgerald for Le Fanu's story Carmilla in The Dark Blue (January 1872), electrotype after wood-engraving, reproduced in Best Ghost Stories, ed. Bleiler.

Vampires have historically been connected with queerness because both have been culturally defined by secrecy, transgression, and the disruption of norms. In both literature and film, scholars have noted that writers have used vampires as a metaphor for forbidden desire, gender fluidity, and the social construction of deviance due to their non-conforming tendencies. Authors have long been interested in vampires because in writing about them, it allows them to explore the way desire crosses boundaries in life and death, gender and sexuality, purity and corruption, without having to state what society forbade during older times: queer relationships.

Literary scholars like Christopher Craft, a literary professor who is known for his work on gender and sexuality in Victorian Literature, and, Marjorie Elizabeth Howes, a professor of English and Irish studies at Boston college who specializes in British literature, as well as, sexuality and gender studies of the 19th-century have argued that in early Gothic texts like Carmilla (1872) and Dracula (1897), the vampire represented anxieties about same-sex attraction and gender inversion, coding queerness as both seductive and dangerous. Modern queer and feminist critics have expanded this analysis by displaying how vampire’s symbolizing "otherness" has been reclaimed by queer writers, especially writers of color, who position the vampire not as a monster but as a figure of resilience, community, and chosen kinship.

== Victorian literature ==
In early Gothic fiction, queerness was hidden through vampirism as a way to express same-sex desire within the constraints of 19th-century censorship. Carmilla (Le Fanu, 1872) and Dracula (Stoker, 1897) use the vampire as a literary substitution for socially forbidden intimacy framing lesbian and homoerotic desire as both seductive and something to be avoided.

== In the 20th century ==
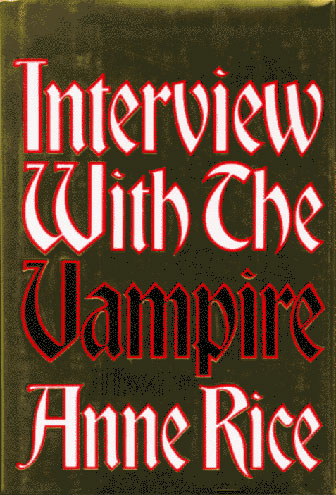
Cover of the book Interview With the Vampire by Anne Rice.

By the 1970s, queer representation shifted from subtext to open visibility in works like Anne Rice's Interview with the Vampire (1976), where vampirism symbolizes fluid sexuality and queer kinship structures.

Later in the 20th century, The Hunger (1983) directed by Tony Scott, played a crucial role in reshaping queer vampire representation. The film centered around a bisexual vampire, Miriam Blaylock (played by Catherine Deneuve) and followed her relationships with both men and women in a sensual and intimate manner instead of moral panic helped bridge the gap between the gothic past and a more open and complex portrayal of queer desire via vampire stories.

== Contemporary media and visibility ==
True Blood Logo

In 21st-century film and television, the vampire is often openly queer, reflecting broader social acceptance. Series like True Blood (2008–2014) and What We Do in the Shadows (2019–2024) abandon allegory entirely, depicting vampires who "come out of the coffin" and navigate civil-rights-style debates about identity.

Other example's include First Kill (TV series) that is based on a short story by Victoria "V. E." Schwab, a New York Times bestselling author, executively produced by Schwab, Emma Roberts and Karah Preiss. It follows a story of a teenage female vampire and a female vampire hunter who navigate between killing each other and falling for one another. Though the show was canceled after not meeting viewing threshold.

=== A list of characters include ===
- Russell Edgington (True Blood) - A key antagonist vampire in the HBO TV Series True Blood who is gay and the partner of Talbot Angelis in the show whose 700 year old bond functioned as driving force for Russell's choices.
- Josh Rosza (The Originals) - A vampire who was a close ally to Marcel, a leading character in the CW's TV series The Originals, that was gay and the partner of Aiden, a werewolf, their relationship was a crucial part in the show as it went against a long standing feud between the two mythical creatures.
- Marceline (Adventure Time) - Is known as the "Vampire Queen" she is a marker of an overtly bisexual character in mainstream animation and is canonically coupled with Princess Bubblegum whose relationship is explored throughout Cartoon Network's animated series Adventure Time.

== Reinterpretations ==
Writers such as Jewelle Gomez and Terri de la Peña have reworked the vampire myth to center Black and Latina lesbian desire, transforming the vampire from a symbol of something to attack, to an example of care and resistance among communities who can relate and restructure the negative connotations previously imposed.

Many note The Gilda Stories (1991) as an important example of the way changing the narrative can influence perspectives. Sabine Meyer acknowledges that vampires have traditionally been represented as exploitative white European males, thus, by making the protagonist a black, lesbian vampire that escapes enslavement, it flips the typical story on its head. Gilda explores lesbian sexuality and relationships through her interactions with other female vampires in a way that is open and not something to look at as shameful.

== See also ==
- Carmilla
- Dracula
- LGBTQ themes in horror fiction
- LGBTQ themes in speculative fiction
- Lesbian vampire
