= Elissa Altman =

American author

- Born: June 29, 1963 (age 63)
- Education: Boston University; Institute of Culinary Education; Gonville & Caius College, Cambridge University
- Occupation: Author
- Website: www.elissaaltman.com

Elissa Altman (born 1963) is an American author, essayist, editor, and teacher. She is the author of the hybrid craft-memoir, Permission: The New Memoirist and the Courage to Create, and three memoirs: Motherland: A Memoir of Love, Loathing, and Longing, Poor Man’s Feast: A Love Story of Comfort, Desire, and the Art of Simple Cooking, and Treyf: My Life as an Unorthodox Outlaw Her narrative food blog, Poor Man's Feast, won a James Beard Foundation Award for Individual Food Blog in 2012; it became the basis for her bestselling newsletter of the same name in 2022.

== Early life and education ==
Altman was born in Manhattan to native New Yorkers Rita Elice, a former television singer and model, and Cy Altman, an advertising agency creative director. She was raised in Forest Hills, Queens and attended local public schools, graduating from Forest Hills High School in 1981. She frequently cites her close relationship with her maternal grandmother, Clara Gross Elice, as one of the most important and supportive of her life. Altman is a survivor of abuse, and writes openly about living and thriving with PTSD, and being an eldercare-giver for her mother, who suffers from clinically diagnosed Narcissistic Personality Disorder; Altman has written extensively about the moral complexities of being an eldercare-giver to an abusive parent. Although Altman grew up in a secular Jewish home, her father was a devoted Anglophile. She describes herself as being an agnostic heavily drawn to Vipassana Buddhism, Quakerism, and interfaith prayer and practice, citing Joseph Goldstein, Sylvia Boorstein, Sharon Salzberg, Parker Palmer, May Sarton, and Doris Grumbach as influences. She graduated with BA in English literature from Boston University in 1985 and in 2013 was the recipient of the Boston University College of General Studies Distinguished Alumni Award. She also attended Gonville & Caius College, Cambridge University in 1983.

After graduating from Boston University, Altman attended the Institute of Culinary Education and worked for Dean & Deluca in the late 1980s, counting among her customers Edna Lewis, Judith Jones, Laurie Colwin, and Peter Hoffman. Altman has played acoustic fingerstyle guitar since she was four years old, studied with Eddie Simon at the Guitar Study Center in the 1970s, and has played semi-professionally over the years.

Altman's paternal cousin was the late musician and composer, Harris Wulfson, and her maternal cousin is Rick Elice, actor, dramatist, and author of Jersey Boys.

== Career ==
Altman began a career in publishing as an editorial assistant at Ballantine Books in 1985, two weeks after her graduation from Boston University. She worked for Dean & Deluca in Manhattan from 1987 to 1990, as a book department manager. Altman left bookselling and worked as an editor at HarperCollins Publishers from 1992 until 2000, specializing in memoir. In 2010, Altman began writing essays for The Huffington Post and in 2008, Altman launched a narrative food blog, Poor Man's Feast, and it won a James Beard Foundation Award for Individual Food Blog in 2012. She is a contributor to publications ranging from The Bitter Southerner and Orion Magazine and Wall Street Journal to LitHub, Lion's Roar, On Being, O:The Oprah Magazine, and The Washington Post, where her column, Feeding My Mother, ran for a year from 2015 to 2016. She has reviewed books for Avenue Magazine, The Boston Globe, and O: The Oprah Magazine, and teaches memoir workshops at Fine Arts Work Center in Provincetown, Truro Center for the Arts, Maine Writers and Publishers Alliance, Kripalu, and beyond. Her work has been nominated for a Pushcart Prize; she was a finalist for the Lambda Literary Award in Memoir, the Maine Literary Award, the Connecticut Book Award, and Frank McCourt Memoir Prize. In 2016, she presented a TEDx talk about the moral necessity of bringing elderly Americans into the national food discussion.

Altman's hybrid craft-memoir, Permission: The New Memoirist and the Courage to Create will be published by Godine Books in 2025. It received advance praise from poet and memoirist Maggie Smith, Katherine May, Anne Lamott, Dani Shapiro, and Kate Christensen; Smith referred to it as "a profound and generous gift." Altman has spoken publicly about the inspiration for writing the book being the profound and personal loss she experienced when writing her first memoir and inadvertently revealing a century-old family secret that touched multiple generations. She describes writing Permission as a soul-healing exploration after the devastation of being excised from her family of origin, and calls it a necessary inquiry into the questions surrounding story ownership and family myth, which every writer at every level experiences.

Her first memoir Poor Man's Feast: A Love Story of Comfort, Desire, and the Art of Simple Cooking was published in 2013. The book is based on her blog, and described by Dawn Drzal in The New York Times as a "smart yet tender tale of her gastronomical and spiritual evolution" from New York City to rural Connecticut with her partner Susan Turner.

Treyf: My Life as an Unorthodox Outlaw was published in 2016 and is a prequel memoir of her Jewish household in 1960s and 1970s Queens, and her experience coming out as a lesbian and marrying a Catholic woman. According to Kirkus Reviews, "Altman not only reveals how she learned to interweave the contradictory threads of her life into a complex whole. She also gives eloquent voice to the universal human desire to belong." In a review for Lambda Literary, Gena Hymowech writes, "I appreciate it when an author can take a random thing, like food, and recognize the way it symbolizes something else, something even more important. And that is exactly what Elissa Altman does in Treyf – food stands in for love, faith, and rebelliousness."

Julie Wittes Schlack writes for WBUR, "The author, her conflicted father, her glamorous, self-starving mother, her friends who chant from the Torah on their bat mitzvahs, then celebrate with shrimp-in-lobster sauce at their post-shul luncheons at the Tung Shing House – they are all modern Americans alternately fleeing and embracing identities rooted in the ancient." According to Publishers Weekly, "Her decades-long struggle to regain the happiness and comfort she felt in her beloved maternal grandmother’s home is depicted lovingly, with many moments of heartbreak and disappointment but also joy and contentment."

Motherland: A Memoir of Love, Loathing, and Longing was published in 2019 and is a memoir that centers on her relationship with her mother. Kirkus Reviews writes, "Funny, raw, and tender, Altman’s book examines the inevitable role reversals that occur in parent-child relationships while laying bare a mother-daughter relationship that is both entertaining and excruciating." According to Publishers Weekly, "Throughout her life Altman struggles to balance devotion to her mother with a need to maintain boundaries for her own self-preservation, all of which comes to a moment of clarity when Altman decides to have children."

== Personal life ==
Altman lives in rural Connecticut with her wife of twenty-five years, Random House book designer Susan Turner.

== Honors and awards ==
- 2012 James Beard Foundation Award for Individual Food Blog
- 2013 Boston University College of General Studies Distinguished Alumni Award
- Finalist, 2020 Lambda Literary Award for Lesbian Memoir or Biography at 32nd Lambda Literary Awards (Motherland)
- Finalist, 2020 Connecticut Center for the Book Connecticut Book Award (Motherland)
- Finalist, 2020 Maine Literary Award (Motherland)
