= Edith Windsor =

American LGBTQ rights activist and technology manager (1929–2017)

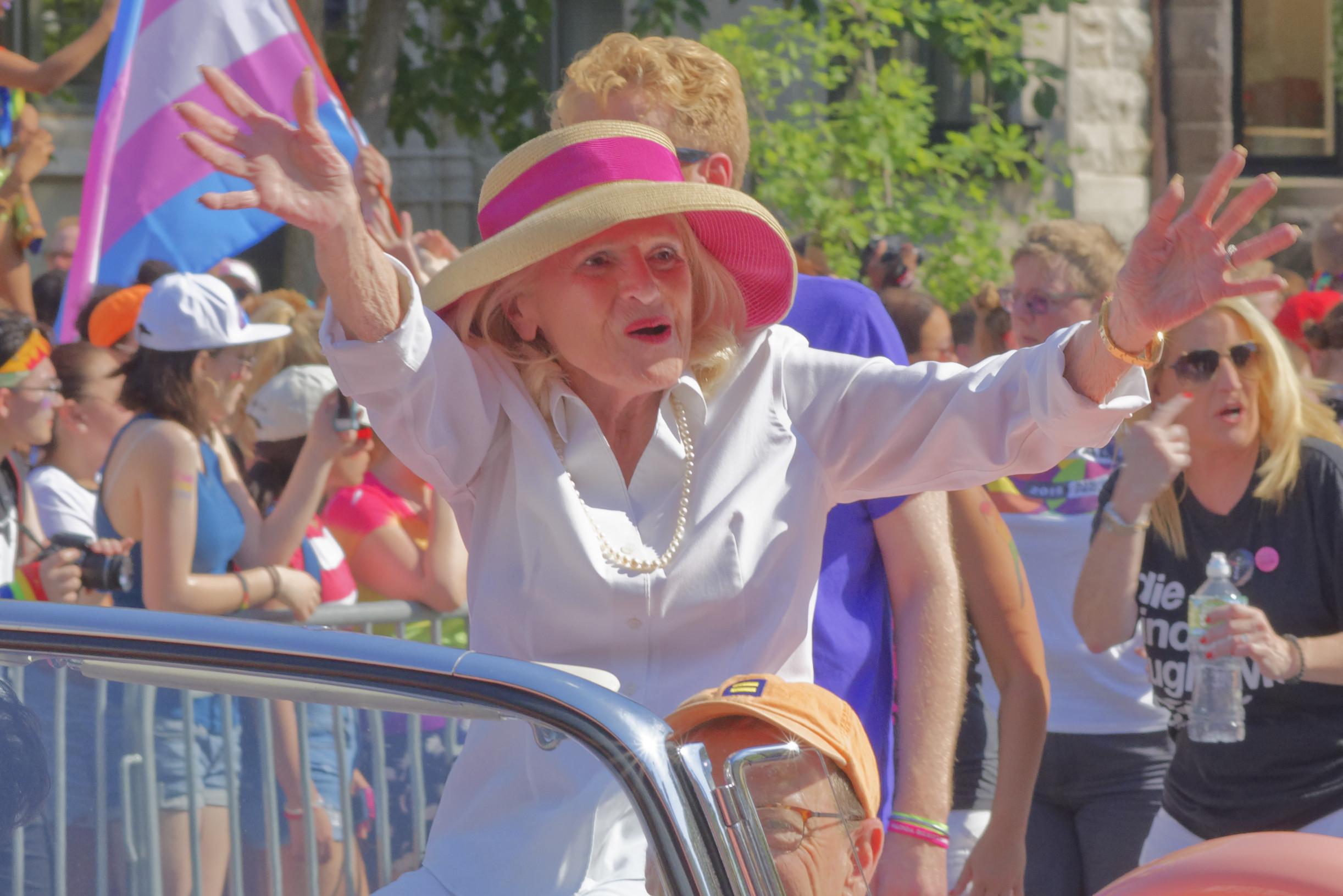
- Windsor at DC Pride 2017
- Born: Edith Schlain; June 20, 1929; Philadelphia, Pennsylvania, U.S.
- Died: September 12, 2017 (aged 88); New York City, U.S.
- Other name: Edie Windsor
- Education: Temple University (BA); New York University (MA)
- Employer: IBM
- Known for: United States v. Windsor
- Movement: LGBT rights
- Spouses: Saul Windsor (m. 1951; div. 1952) Thea Clara Spyer (m. 2007; died 2009) Judith Kasen (m. 2016)
- Awards: See below
- Website: ediewindsor.org

Edith Windsor (née Schlain; June 20, 1929 – September 12, 2017) was an American LGBT rights activist and a technology manager at IBM. She was the lead plaintiff in the 2013 Supreme Court of the United States case United States v. Windsor, which overturned Section 3 of the Defense of Marriage Act and was considered a landmark legal victory for the same-sex marriage movement in the United States. The Obama administration and federal agencies extended rights, privileges and benefits to married same-sex couples because of the decision.

== Early life and education ==
Windsor was born in Philadelphia, Pennsylvania, on June 20, 1929, the youngest of three children of James and Celia Schlain, a Russian Jewish immigrant family of modest means. During her childhood, her family suffered as a result of the Great Depression, and her father lost both his candy-and-ice-cream store and their home above it. In school, she at times experienced anti-Semitism. Throughout school, she dated boys her age, but said later she recalls having crushes on girls.

Windsor received her bachelor's degree from Temple University in 1950. In 1955, she began pursuing a master's degree in mathematics, which she obtained from New York University in 1957. She then joined IBM, where she worked for the next sixteen years. During this time, she spent two semesters studying applied mathematics at Harvard University on an IBM fellowship.

== Career ==
While attending New York University, Windsor worked for the university's math department, entering data into its UNIVAC. She also worked as a programmer at Combustion Engineering, Inc., where she worked with physicists and the UNIVAC.

After receiving her master's degree in mathematics in 1957 from New York University, Windsor began work in senior technical and management positions at IBM in 1958. Her work at IBM was primarily related to systems architecture and implementation of operating systems and natural language processors. Windsor began her career at IBM as a mainframe programmer. In May 1968, she attained the title designating the highest level technical position at IBM, senior systems programmer. Windsor worked at IBM for 16 years and was well known around IBM for her "top-notch debugging skills". She received the first IBM PC delivered in New York City. However, the company rejected her insurance form naming her partner Thea Spyer as a beneficiary. Windsor also assisted the Atomic Energy Commission, and was at one point even investigated by the FBI. Windsor feared that it was because of her closeted homosexuality. This was during the time right after the Lavender Scare. She later found out it was because of her sister's ties to the Teachers' Union.

In 1975, Windsor left IBM and became the founding president of PC Classics, a consulting firm specializing in software development projects. During this time consulting, Windsor helped many LGBTQ groups become "tech literate". She helped many LGBTQ organizations computerize their mail systems.

== Personal life ==
Saul Windsor was Edie's older brother's best friend, whom she had known for many years and respected. They went to college together and during their third year, Saul proposed marriage and Edie accepted. Their relationship ended at one time during the engagement when Edie fell in love with a female classmate. However, after Windsor decided she did not want to live life as a lesbian, they reconciled and got married after graduation, in May 1951. They divorced less than one year afterward, on March 3, 1952, and she confided in him that she longed to be with women. Shortly after her divorce, Windsor left Philadelphia for New York City.

Windsor met Thea Spyer, an Amsterdam-born psychologist, in 1963 at Portofino, a restaurant in Greenwich Village. When they initially met, each was already in a relationship. They occasionally saw each other at events over the next two years, but it was not until a trip to the East End of Long Island in the late spring of 1965 that they began dating each other. To help keep the relationship a secret from her co-workers, Windsor invented a relationship with Spyer's fictional brother Willy – who was actually a childhood doll belonging to Windsor – to explain Spyer's phone calls to the office. In 1967, Spyer asked Windsor to marry, although it was not yet legal anywhere in the United States. Fearing that a traditional engagement ring might expose Windsor's sexual orientation to her coworkers, Spyer instead proposed with a circular diamond pin.

Six months after getting engaged, Windsor and Spyer moved into an apartment in Greenwich Village. In 1968, they purchased a small house on Long Island together, where they went on vacation for the following forty summers. The couple often took trips both in the United States and internationally. They also entertained at their home frequently, with Spyer preparing meals, including an annual Memorial Day weekend celebration of their anniversary.

In 1977, Spyer was diagnosed with progressive multiple sclerosis. The disease caused a gradual, but ever-increasing paralysis. Windsor used her early retirement to become a full-time caregiver for Spyer, and the couple continued to adjust their daily behavior to accommodate.

Windsor and Spyer entered a domestic partnership in New York City in 1993. Registering on the first available day, they were issued certificate number eighty.

Spyer suffered a heart attack in 2002 and was diagnosed with aortic stenosis. In 2007, her doctors told her she had less than a year to live. New York had not yet legalized same-sex marriage, so the couple opted to marry in Toronto, Canada, on May 22, 2007, with Canada's first openly gay judge, Justice Harvey Brownstone, presiding, and with the assistance of a filmmaker and same-sex marriage activist familiar with the laws in both countries. An announcement of their wedding was published in The New York Times. Spyer died from complications related to her heart condition on February 5, 2009. After Spyer's death, Windsor was hospitalized with stress cardiomyopathy.

On September 26, 2016, Windsor married Judith Kasen at New York City Hall. At the time of the wedding, Windsor was age 87 and Kasen was age 51.

Windsor was also a member of the non-denominational Congregation Beit Simchat Torah synagogue, which has been self-described as the world's largest LGBTQ synagogue.

In October 2019, Windsor's memoir A Wild and Precious Life was published by St. Martin's Press. The writing was begun before Windsor's death in 2017 and was completed by her co-author Joshua Lyon. It was also released as an audiobook, read by Donna Postel and Joshua Lyon.

== Activism ==
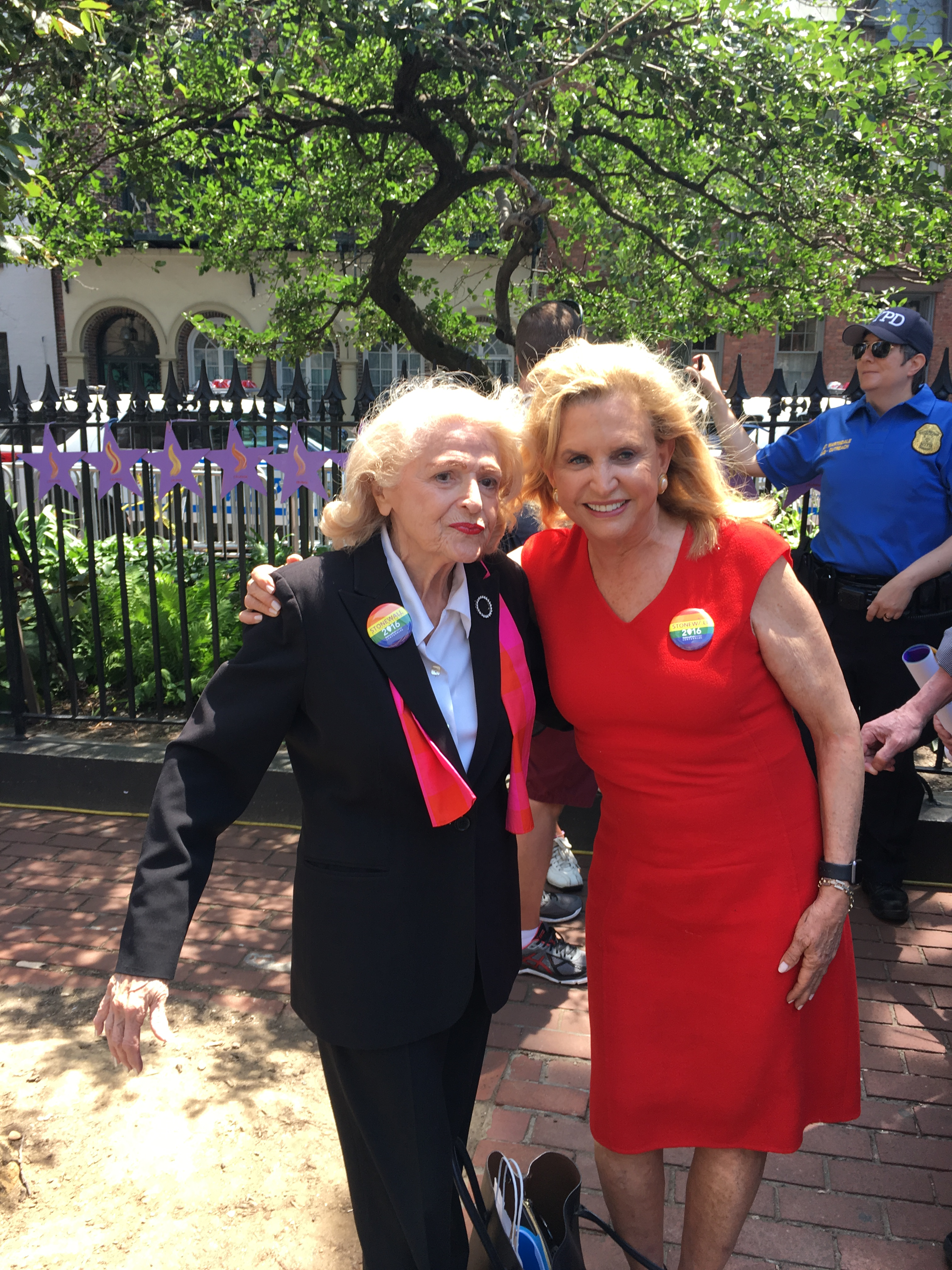
Windsor with Carolyn Maloney in 2016

In June 1969, Windsor and Spyer returned from a vacation in Italy to discover the Stonewall Riots had begun the night before. In the following years, the couple publicly participated in LGBT marches and events. They also lent their Cadillac convertible to LGBT rights organizations.

Following her departure from IBM in 1975, she increased her involvement with LGBT organizations. She volunteered for the Gay & Lesbian Advocates & Defenders, the East End Gay Organization, the LGBT Community Center, 1994 Gay Games New York, and helped found Old Queers Acting Up, an improv group utilizing skits to address social justice issues. She served on the board of Services & Advocacy for GLBT Elders (SAGE) from 1986 to 1988 and again from 2005 to 2007.

Windsor continued to be a public advocate for same-sex marriage in the years following United States v. Windsor. She helped Senator Dianne Feinstein and Representative Jerrold Nadler introduce the Respect for Marriage Act at a press conference in Washington, D.C., in 2011. She was also a prominent supporter of Israeli LGBT rights group A Wider Bridge. In 2013, Time magazine named Windsor as a finalist for their Person of the Year award, losing out only to Pope Francis. Later in life, she became an ardent supporter of New York City's largest LGBTQ+ band, the Lesbian & Gay Big Apple Corps, calling them "her band". They performed a concert called The Roaring Music of Women: A Tribute to the Iconic Edie Windsor in her honor on Saturday, April 7, 2018.

== United States v. Windsor ==
Upon Spyer's death on February 5, 2009, Windsor became the executor and sole beneficiary of Spyer's estate, via a revocable trust. Windsor was required to pay $363,053 in federal estate taxes on her inheritance of her wife's estate. Had federal law recognized the validity of their marriage, Windsor would have qualified for an unlimited spousal deduction and paid no federal estate taxes.

Windsor sought to claim the federal estate tax exemption for surviving spouses. She was barred from doing so by Section 3 of the Defense of Marriage Act (DOMA) (codified at 1 U.S.C. § 7), which provided that the term "spouse" only applied to marriages between a man and woman. The Internal Revenue Service found that the exemption did not apply to same-sex marriages, denied Windsor's claim, and compelled her to pay $363,053 in estate taxes.

In 2010 Windsor filed a lawsuit against the federal government in the U.S. District Court for the Southern District of New York, seeking a refund because DOMA singled out legally married same-sex couples for "differential treatment compared to other similarly situated couples without justification." In 2012, Judge Barbara S. Jones ruled that Section 3 of DOMA was unconstitutional under the due process guarantees of the Fifth Amendment and ordered the federal government to issue the tax refund, including interest. The U.S. Second Circuit Court of Appeals affirmed in a 2–1 decision later in 2012.

The U.S. Supreme Court heard oral arguments in the case in March 2013, and on June 26 of that year issued a 5–4 decision affirming that Section 3 of DOMA was unconstitutional "as a deprivation of the liberty of the person protected by the Fifth Amendment."

== Recognition ==
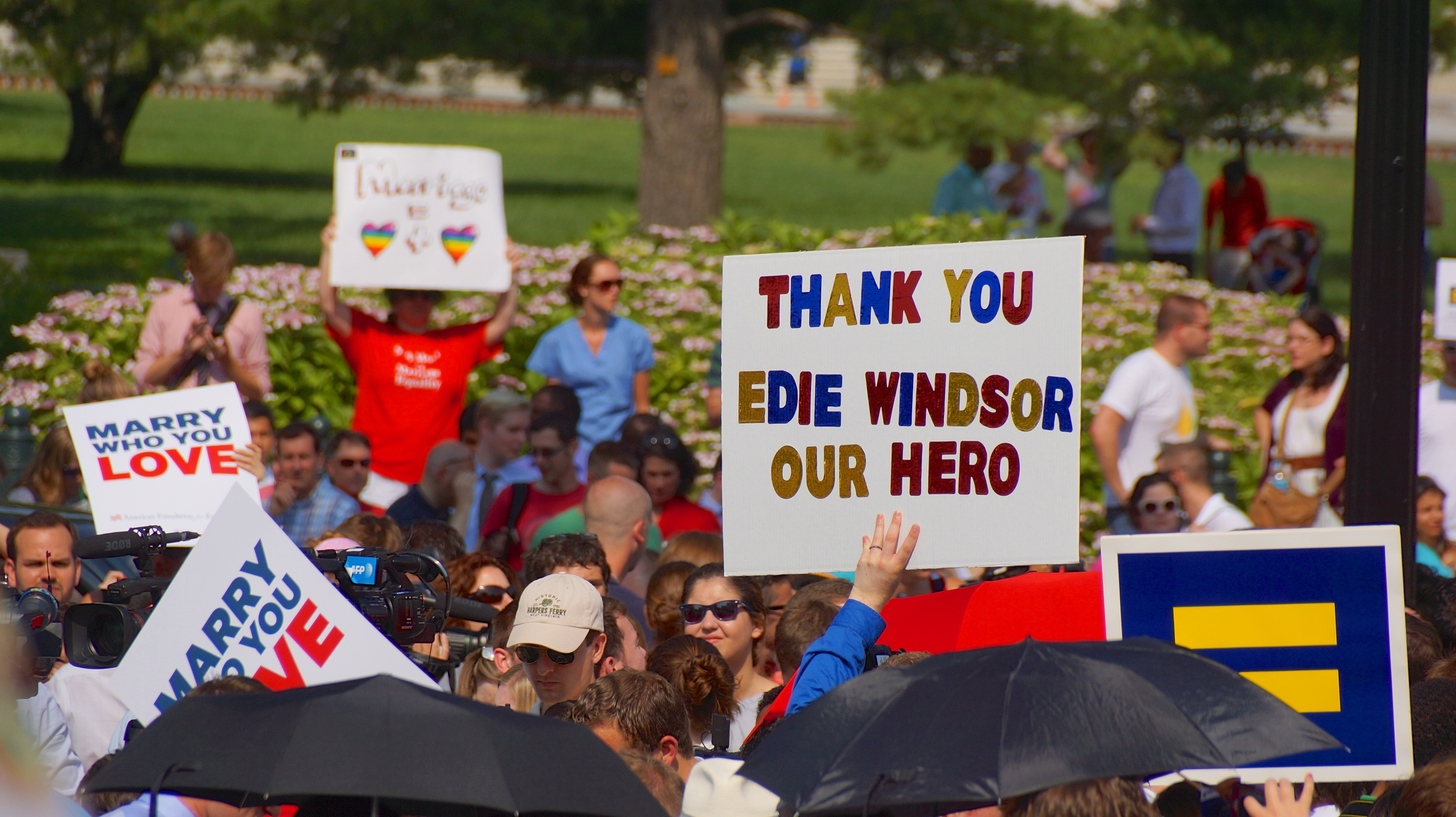
Sign thanking Windsor at a rally supporting same-sex marriage

Windsor was honored by the National Computing Conference in 1987 as a "pioneer in operating systems".

On Windsor's 70th birthday in 1999, the Edie Windsor Fund for Old Lesbians was gifted to Windsor by Spyer and their friends. It is maintained and administered by Open Meadows Foundation, and provides grants to projects for and by older lesbians.

A 2009 documentary, Edie & Thea: A Very Long Engagement, by Susan Muska and Greta Olfsdottir, documents Windsor and Spyer's life and wedding. The DVD of the film contains a full-length interview with Justice Harvey Brownstone, the Canadian judge who officiated at the Windsor/Spyer wedding.

She was the grand marshal of the 2013 New York City LGBT Pride March.

She was a runner-up, to Pope Francis, for 2013 Time Person of the Year.

Windsor was honored as The New Jewish Home's Eight Over Eighty Gala 2014 honoree.

On May 22, 2014, she received an honorary Doctorate of Humane Letters from Johns Hopkins University.

In June 2014 Windsor traveled back to Toronto, the city where she married Thea Spyer, to receive an award at WorldPride. While in Toronto she appeared on the CTV Television Network's national morning show, Canada AM, with Harvey Brownstone, the Toronto judge who officiated at her wedding.

On June 26, 2014, Windsor was featured on Logo TV's 2014 LOGO Trailblazers.

In 2016, Lesbians Who Tech initiated the Edie Windsor Coding Scholarship Fund.

In 2017, the Midtown SAGE Center for LGBT seniors in Manhattan was renamed as The Edie Windsor SAGE Center in New York City.

In 2018, a block of South 13th Street in Philadelphia was designated as Edie Windsor Way.

In June 2019, Windsor was one of the inaugural fifty American "pioneers, trailblazers, and heroes" inducted on the National LGBTQ Wall of Honor within the Stonewall National Monument (SNM) in New York City's Stonewall Inn. The SNM is the first U.S. national monument dedicated to LGBTQ rights and history, while the Wall's unveiling was timed to take place during the 50th anniversary of the Stonewall riots.

=== Awards ===
Windsor received numerous awards related to her work in technology and LGBT activism.

| Award | Presented by | Date | Notes |
|---|---|---|---|
| Joyce Warshaw Lifetime Achievement Award | Services & Advocacy for GLBT Elders (SAGE) | October 25, 2010 | |
| Trailblazer in Law Award | Marriage Equality New York | May 19, 2011 | |
| Roger Baldwin Medal of Liberty | American Civil Liberties Union | June 11, 2011 | |
| New York City Council Award | New York City Council | June 16, 2011 | Presented during council's Gay Pride celebration |
| Edie Windsor & Thea Spyer Equality Award | The LOFT | 2012 | |
| Susan B. Anthony Award | National Organization for Women New York City | February 15, 2012 | |
| Visionary Award | NewFest | 2012 | |
| Trailblazer Award | New York City LGBT Community Center | April 11, 2013 | |
| Eugene J. Keogh Award for Distinguished Public Service at New York University | New York University | May 22, 2013 | |
| Presidential Medal | New York University | May 24, 2013 | |
| Keeping Faith Award | American Constitution Society for Law & Policy | September 17, 2013 | |
| Lifetime Leadership Award | National Gay & Lesbian Task Force | October 8, 2013 | |
| Trailblazer of Democracy Award | The Eleanor Roosevelt Legacy Award | October 11, 2013 | |
| Individual Leadership Award | PFLAG | October 14, 2013 | |
| Alumni Achievement Award | New York University Graduate School of Arts and Science | October 18, 2013 | |
| American Spirit Award for Citizen Activism | Common Good Award | November 13, 2013 | |
| Out 100 – Lifetime Achievement Award | Out | November 13, 2013 | |
| The Imperial Diamond Award for Vision – Support – Activism | Imperial Court System New York | March 29, 2014 | |
| Ovation Award | Olivia Cruises | 2014 | |
| Laurel Hester Award | Gay Officers Action League (GOAL) – New York | April 25, 2014 | |
| Women's Rights Award | American Federation of Teachers (AFT) | July 14, 2014 | |
| Named by Equality Forum as one of their 31 Icons of the 2015 LGBT History Month | Equality Forum | 2015 | |

== Death ==
On September 12, 2017, Windsor's wife Judith Kasen-Windsor confirmed that Windsor had died in Manhattan, but did not specify a cause. Former US president Bill Clinton, New York Governor Andrew Cuomo, California US senator Dianne Feinstein, and various politicians and celebrities posted words of tribute on their Twitter accounts. Former secretary of state Hillary Clinton spoke at her funeral.

== See also ==
- LGBT rights in the United States
