= Trisha Low =

American author and poet

- Education: University of Pennsylvania; New York University
- Occupation: Author
- Writing career
- Notable work: Socialist Realism
- Notable awards: Believer Book Award; Lambda Literary Award

Trisha Low is an American author and poet.

== Life and career ==
Low graduated from the University of Pennsylvania with a BA and New York University with an MA in Performance Studies.

She contributed to the 2011 publication, Against Expression: An Anthology of Conceptual Writing, edited by Craig Dworkin and Kenneth Goldsmith.

Her 2013 book, The Compleat Purge, examines how fantasy can impact perceptions including those of female identity.

Her book Socialist Realism was published in 2019 and focuses on Low's early childhood and adulthood. It looks at themes such as home and identity and examines her relationships, family and politics. It won the 2019 Believer Book Award in the nonfiction category and the 2020 Lambda Literary Award for Bisexual Nonfiction

She has also written for the San Francisco Museum of Modern Art.

== Biblio ==
- The Compleat Purge (2013)
- Socialist Realism (2019)
