= Alvin Orloff =

American writer and bookstore proprietor

Alvin Orloff is an American writer and bookstore proprietor in San Francisco.

== Career ==
Orloff spent 21 years as the manager of Dog-Eared Books in San Francisco before purchasing the Castro Street branch and renaming it Fabulosa Books in 2021, on his 60th birthday. In 2022, he launched a "Books Not Bans" program that sent banned books to organizations in conservative areas. Fabulosa Books won the Bay Area Reporter's award for "Favorite Bookstore" for three years in a row.

His debut novel, I Married an Earthling, was described by Publishers Weekly as "queer sci-fi social commentary." His memoir Disasterama! was a finalist for the Lambda Literary Award for Best Memoir/Biography.
