= Hazel Jane Plante =

Canadian writer

Hazel Jane Plante is a Canadian writer from Vancouver, British Columbia, whose debut novel Little Blue Encyclopedia (for Vivian) was published in 2019. The book won the Lambda Literary Award for Transgender Literature at the 32nd Lambda Literary Awards in 2020, and was a shortlisted finalist for Publishing Triangle's Leslie Feinberg Award and the Jim Deva Prize for Writing that Provokes.

Her second novel, Any Other City, was published in 2023, and was shortlisted for the Ethel Wilson Fiction Prize in 2024.

She served on the jury for the Dayne Ogilvie Prize in 2024.
