= Summer Sons =

Novel by Lee Mandelo

- Cover of the first edition
- Author: Lee Mandelo
- Cover artist: Sasha Vinogradova
- Language: English
- Genre: Southern Gothic Paranormal
- Publisher: Tor Books
- Publication date: September 28, 2021
- Publication place: United States
- ISBN: 978-1-250-79028-6
- Dewey Decimal: 813/.6

Summer Sons is a Southern Gothic campus novel by Lee Mandelo, published by Tordotcom in 2021. It follows the story of Andrew, a graduate student at Vanderbilt University, attempting to unravel the mysterious circumstances surrounding the sudden death of his best friend.

The book is set in Tennessee, and deals with paranormal themes, myths, and legends of the American South. It contains elements of dark academia, addressing topics such as homophobia, rural poverty, and racism in educational institutions.

It utilizes third-person narration to explore Andrew's life, with interspersing flashbacks to explain his relationship with his best friend, Eddie. Even though everyone thinks Eddie committed suicide, Andrew believes that his death ties into an ancient curse following a ritual they performed together several years ago.

== Synopsis ==
The book's protagonist, Andrew, investigates the suicide of his friend Eddie just six months after Eddie left to begin a master's degree.

== Publishing history ==
The cover was designed and created by Christine Foltzer and Sasha Vinogradova, and was revealed in January 2021. The book was then published on September 28, 2021.

== Reception ==
The book received generally good reviews, with commentators noting the atmosphere and queer themes in particular, but received some criticism for its pacing. Sarah Campsall of The Nerd Daily described it as "a haunting, slow burn of a novel that explores grief, loss, denial, and a hunt for truth set against an atmospheric backdrop of the humid heat of the south," comparing it to Maggie Stiefvater's The Raven Cycle. Publishers Weekly described the book as "like Tennessee molasses—dense, dark, slow-moving, and with a distinct Southern flavor," stating that the book shines most in its love triangle. Sadie Hartmann of Cemetery Dance found that "it’s powerful that Mandelo crushes queer stereotypes," but that "heading into the middle of the book, the story gets bogged down some." Writing for Jezebel, Alix E. Harrow compared it to the Fast & Furious franchise, describing it as "hot, haunted boys with fast cars making bad choices."
