= Emily St. James =

American journalist and author (born 1982)

- Born: November 30, 1982 (age 43); Armour, South Dakota, U.S.
- Education: South Dakota State University
- Occupations: Critic; writer; journalist; author
- Spouse: Libby Hill (m. 2003)
- Children: 1
- Writing career
- Notable works: Monsters of the Week: The Complete Critical Companion to The X-Files; Woodworking

Emily Nicole St. James (née VanDerWerff; November 30, 1982) is an American critic, journalist, podcaster, television writer, and author. She primarily writes about television. She has written for Vox, The A.V. Club, The Guardian, The Los Angeles Times, Grantland, and Slant Magazine, among others. She is a writer on the television series Yellowjackets. She published her debut novel, Woodworking, in 2025.

== Education ==
St. James graduated from South Dakota State University in 2004 with a BA in journalism. At the university, St. James wrote for the university's student publication, The Collegian.

== Career ==
=== Critic and editor ===
From 2009 to 2014, St. James was TV editor for The A.V. Club, helping to build the TV Club, known for television criticism of shows episode by episode. TV Club, while led by St. James, has been credited with helping build the online culture of television recaps.

In June 2014, St. James joined Vox as culture editor, going on to become their critic at large. She is also involved in Arden, a true crime parody podcast, as well as running Vox's Primetime, a television history podcast. She was a finalist in the 2015 Online Journalism Awards for her media criticism around horror films, coverage of Hillary Clinton's presidential campaign announcement, and review of Mad Max: Fury Road.

In 2018, St. James and fellow critic Zack Handlen wrote Monsters of the Week: The Complete Critical Companion to The X-Files, which was published by Tor Books. This was followed in 2024 by Lost: Back to the Island: The Complete Critical Companion to the Classic TV Series, which she co-wrote with Noel Murray.

In July 2020, she spoke out against fellow Vox co-founder and contributor Matthew Yglesias, following his signing of an open letter published in Harper's Magazine which called for an end to what it described as "illiberalism". After a tweet about her criticism by Jesse Singal, one of the letter's signatories, St. James reported that she had received death threats.

St. James has appeared on The George Lucas Talk Show during their May the 4th Marathon and Holiday Special.

=== Television and novel writing ===
After leaving Vox, St. James moved into novel and television writing. She and her wife joined the writers' room of Yellowjackets for the show's third season, receiving writing credits for the sixth episode, broadcast in March 2025.

In the same month, St. James' debut novel, Woodworking, was published by Zando. The book, a coming-of-age story set in Mitchell, South Dakota, is about Erica Skyberg, a high school teacher who is a closeted trans woman. In order to figure out how to come out to her peers, Erica enlists the help of a student, Abigail Hawkes, a trans girl (and the only openly trans person Erica knows).

Her second novel, Beth March Returns From The Dead, is due for publication in 2027. Inspired by Little Women, it follows a young trans woman returning to her hometown for Christmas.

== Personal life ==
St. James came out as a trans woman in 2019. She was interviewed on NPR's Weekend Edition Sunday about her experience with gender. She is a founding member of the Trans Journalists Association and helped create its style guide, a resource for other journalists to more accurately write about transgender people and issues.

St. James has been married to writer Libby Hill since 2003. She changed her last name from VanDerWerff to St. James in January 2022. St. James and Hill welcomed a child in 2022.
