= Samantha Leigh Allen =

American writer

- Born: California, U.S.
- Education: Brigham Young University; Rutgers University; Emory University (PhD)
- Occupations: Journalist; author
- Writing career
- Notable work: Real Queer America (2019)
- Notable awards: GLAAD Media Award (2018)
- Website: samanthaleighallen.com

Samantha Leigh Allen is an American journalist and author. Allen worked as a reporter for The Daily Beast and now works as the managing editor at Them. In 2019, she published the nonfiction book Real Queer America: LGBT Stories From Red States.

== Early life and education ==
Allen was born in California and grew up in New Jersey. She was raised in a conservative Mormon household. As a young adult she served as a Mormon missionary. She officially left the Church of Jesus Christ of Latter-day Saints in 2008 and transferred from Brigham Young University to Rutgers University later that year. She came out as a trans woman in 2012.

She has a Ph.D. in women's, gender, and sexuality studies with a certificate in psychoanalytic studies from Emory University. She was a recipient of a George W. Woodruff Fellowship while at Emory. In 2013, she received the John Money Fellowship for Scholars of Sexology from the Kinsey Institute at Indiana University Bloomington. In 2014, she was a recipient of the Unsung Heroine Award from the Center for Women at Emory as well as a Transgender Advocate of the Year Award from Emory's Office of LGBT Life.

== Career ==
Allen covered LGBTQ stories as a senior reporter for The Daily Beast and worked as a staff writer for Fusion TV's Sex + Life vertical. She later became the managing editor at Them. She has written for The New York Times, Rolling Stone, Out, CNN, and Crosscut.com. Allen has also written for LGBTQ media outlets including Them and Logo TV's NewNowNext as a freelance writer. She also writes a travel newsletter called Get Lost and co-hosts a podcast about the WNBA called Double W with Laurel Powell.

In 2018, she received the GLAAD Media Award for Outstanding Digital Journalism Article for her article on the cultural erasure of bisexual men. In 2018, Allen published Love & Estrogen with Amazon Original Stories, an autobiographical romantic comedy about meeting her wife at the Kinsey Institute. In 2019, she was nominated for a GLAAD Award her piece on non-binary inclusion in the workplace.

In 2019 she published the memoir Real Queer America: LGBT Stories From Red States, which won the Judy Turner Prize for Community Service at the Decatur Books Festival. Her book focuses on LGBTQ communities in Utah, Texas, Indiana, Tennessee, Georgia, and Mississippi. Real Queer America was a finalist for the 2020 Lambda Literary Award for Transgender Nonfiction. In October 2020, Allen published a self-narrated Audible audiobook of humorous stories from her transition titled M to (WT)F.

Allen's first novel, Patricia Wants to Cuddle, was published June 28, 2022 by Zando. It follows the final four contestants on a reality television dating game show as they encounter a creature in the woods on a remote island. Her next novel, Roland Rogers Isn't Dead Yet, was also published by Zando on September 10, 2024. The novel revolves around a ghostwriter who is appointed by a closeted actor to write his memoir, only to discover that said actor is dead by the time they are scheduled to meet.

== Bibliography ==
- Real Queer America: LGBT Stories from Red States. Little, Brown and Company. 2019. ISBN 978-0-316-51603-7.
- Patricia Wants to Cuddle. Zando. 2022. ISBN 978-1-63893-004-4.
- Roland Rogers Isn't Dead Yet. Zando. 2024. ISBN 9781638931539.
- Puck. Zando. 2026. ISBN 978-1-63893-341-0
