= Real Queer America =

2019 non-fiction book by Samantha Allen

Real Queer America: LGBT Stories From Red States
- Author: Samantha Leigh Allen
- Language: English
- Genre: Nonfiction
- Published: 2019
- Publisher: Little, Brown
- Publication place: United States
- ISBN: 978-0-316-51603-7 Hardcover

Real Queer America: LGBT Stories From Red States is a 2019 nonfiction book written by Samantha Allen. The book documents a road trip Allen took in the summer of 2017 through LGBTQ communities in conservative parts of the United States, focusing on Utah, Texas, Indiana, Tennessee, Mississippi, and Georgia.

== Critical reception ==
The New York Times wrote, "Allen’s powerful book of memoir and reportage, Real Queer America, is decidedly more serious in tone, but it's no less entertaining. The Daily Beast reporter gathers stories from L.G.B.T.Q. people she met in conservative states across the country on a road trip she took in July 2017, the first summer of the Trump presidency."

The Los Angeles Times called Real Queer America “a book necessary for anyone in or allied with the queer community.” Publishers Weekly labeled the book “the ultimate road-trip through rainbow-colored America.”

Real Queer America was a finalist for the 2020 Lambda Literary Award for Transgender Nonfiction.

== See also ==
- LGBTQ literature
