= Aishah Shahidah Simmons =

American documentary filmmaker, author, and educator

Aishah Shahidah Simmons is an American documentary filmmaker, author, educator, and activist based in Philadelphia, Pennsylvania.

Her 2006 film, NO! The Rape Documentary, addressed sexual assault in the black community, a topic that has, according to Cynthia Greenlee-Donnell "traditionally been so attuned to racism outside that it has largely turned a deaf ear and a blind eye to gender violence within." In a review of NO!, Andrea Williams described the documentary as "notable, not only for its critical exposition, but also for the ways in which it places Black women's voices at the center of its narrative."

== Career ==
Simmons has held professorships at universities throughout the United States. She was the 2015–2016 Sterling Brown Professor of Africana Studies at Williams College, an adjunct professor in the Women’s and LGBT Studies Program at Temple University, an O’Brien Distinguished Visiting Professor in the Feminist, Gender and Sexuality Studies Department at Scripps College, and a Visiting Lecturer in the Department of Cinema and Media Studies at the University of Chicago. She was an Artist-in-Residence at the Center for the Study of Race, Politics and Culture at the University of Chicago and at Spelman College’s Digital Moving Image Salon.

== Awards and honors ==
- Amnesty International Women’s Human Rights Program Discretionary Grant (2003)
- Rockefeller Foundation Artist’s Fellowship nominee (2003)
- Gloria Steinem Fund of the Ms. Foundation for Women (2004)
- National Sexual Violence Resource Center's National Award for Outstanding Response to and Prevention of Sexual Violence (2006)
- Artist-in-Residence, Center for the Study of Race, Politics and Culture, University of Chicago (2009)
- NO! The Rape Documentary included in Ford Foundation's JustFilms online archive (2011)
- Co-honoree, with Staceyann Chinn and Fadzai Muparutsa (Coalition of African Lesbians), Black Women's Blueprint's performance (2013)
- Sterling Brown '22 Visiting Professor of Africana Studies, Williams College (2016)
- Just Beginnings Collaborative Fellow (2016–2018)

== Filmography ==
- “Feminists We Love”: Linda Janet Holmes (2014) Color/Digital Video/60-minutes
- “Feminists We Love”: Gloria I. Josepeh, Ph.D. (2014) Color/Digital Video/60-minutes
- “Feminists We Love”: Elizabeth Lorde-Rollins, M.D., M.Sc., (2014) Color/Digital Video/60-minutes
- Breaking Silences: A Supplemental Video to NO! (2008), USA Color/Digital Video/112 minutes
- For Women of Rage and Reason (2006), USA Color/Digital Video/4:40 minutes
- NO! The Rape Documentary (2006), USA Color/Digital Video 94-minutes
- NO! A Work-in-Progress (1997, 2000, 2002), USA, Color/Digital Video/8-minutes, 20-minutes- and 74-minutes
- In My Father’s House (1996), USA, Color/Video/15-minutes
- Silence…Broken (1993), USA, Color/Video/8-minutes

== Publications ==
- Simmons, Aishah Shahidah (2000). "Creating a Sacred Space of Our Own". In Gold, Jodi; Villari, Susan (eds.). Just Sex: Students Rewrite the Rules on Sex, Violence, Activism, and Equality. Lanham, Md. - Boulder - New York - Oxford: Rowman & Littlefield. pp. 47–58. ISBN 978-0-8476-9332-0.
- Simmons, Aishah Shahidah (2007). "Asserting My In(ter)dependence: The Evolution of NO!". In Holmes, Linda Janet; Wall, Cheryl A. (eds.). Savoring the Salt: The Legacy of Toni Cade Bambara. Philadelphia: Temple University Press. pp. 206–214. ISBN 978-1-59213-624-7.
- Simmons, Aishah Shahidah (2014). "Foreword". In Factora-Borchers, Lisa (ed.). Dear Sister: Letters From Survivors of Sexual Violence. Edinburgh, Oakland, Baltimore: AK Press. ISBN 978-1-84935-172-0.
- Simmons, Aishah Shahidah, ed. (2019). Love WITH Accountability: Digging up the Roots of Child Sexual Abuse. La Vergne: AK Press. ISBN 9781849353526.
