= Noam Sienna =

Author and Jewish educator

Noam Sienna is a sofer, author, and Jewish educator in Minneapolis.

== Education ==
Sienna graduated Brandeis University in 2011. In May 2020, he graduated from the University of Minnesota with a PhD in Jewish history.

== Henna ==
The topic of Sienna's undergraduate thesis was the use of henna in Jewish traditions. Sienna studied in Israel and interviewed Jewish immigrants from other countries including Iraq and Yemen, gathering information about traditions that had become obscure. He found that henna was traditionally used by Jews in the Middle East and Africa to commemorate life-cycle events such as birth or a new home.

== A Rainbow Thread ==
Sienna's book A Rainbow Thread: An Anthology of Queer Jewish Texts from the First Century to 1969, published in 2019, comprised a collection of 120 texts from 16 languages related to rabbinic perspectives on sexuality and gender. The book received a 2020 Lambda Literary Award for LGBTQ Anthology as well as the 2020 Judaica Reference Award from the Association of Jewish Libraries.
