= Joshua Lyon =

American journalist and author

Joshua Kennedy Lyon is an American journalist and author. He is the author of Pill Head: The Secret Life of a Painkiller Addict, published by Hyperion on July 7, 2009. Pill Head is part memoir, part investigative journalism and chronicles prescription painkiller abuse in America. He currently resides in Kingston, New York.

== Biography ==
Joshua Lyon was born in Nashville, TN. He attended high school at Hamilton Central in Hamilton, New York and majored in Literature at Purchase College.

== Books ==
Pill Head: The Secret Life of a Painkiller Addict is part memoir and part investigative journalism. The book weaves together the stories and views of addicts, doctors, experts and governmental agents—demonstrating how the lives and decisions of each are intertwined in America's drug epidemic.

In the summer of 2003, Lyon noticed a large amount of email spam promoting easy procurement of drugs like Valium, Xanax, and Vicodin, without a prescription. In the name of "journalistic curiosity", Lyon convinced his editor to let him try to buy the pills online for a story, to see if the emails were legitimate.

Lyon acquired the online drug delivery with a budget of $600 provided by Fairchild Publications. Lyon wrote the article and later that night his curiosity led him to sample from the stash. Lyon recounted in his book that his editor called him in a panic, and asked what he had done with the pills. She was nervous that he had taken them. He assured her that he would flush the pills down the toilet, then promptly went and took three Vicodin. "That was all it took to seal the deal — I'd discovered my perfect drug," he said in the book.

== Reception ==
Pill Head received a starred Kirkus review, and Mother Jones named it one of the top books of 2009.

== Ghostwriting ==
Lyon is also a professional ghostwriter and co-author. His co-authored book with YouTube personality Joey Graceffa was a New York Times bestseller.
