= Gretchen Felker-Martin =

American author and critic

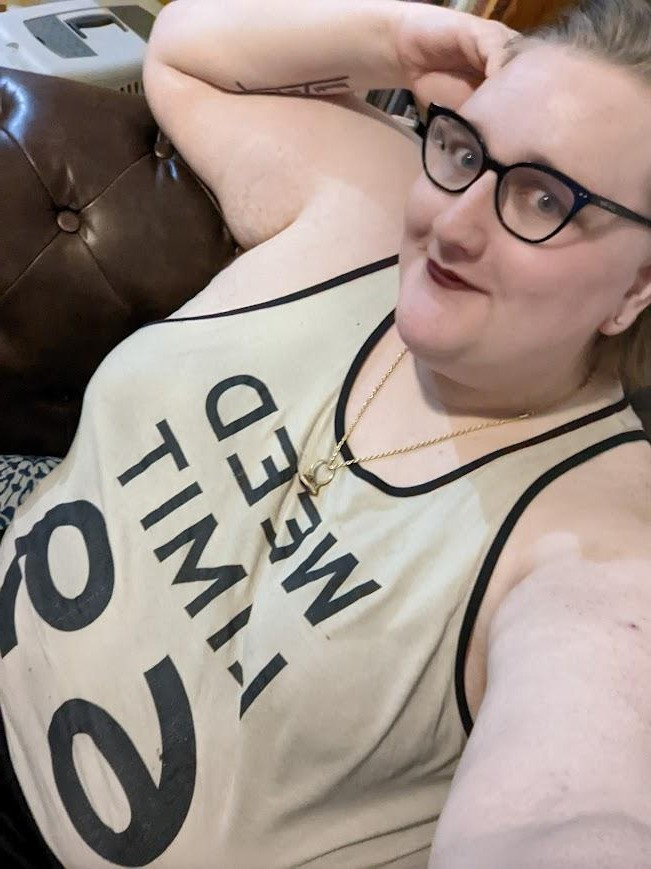
- Born: New Hampshire, U.S.
- Occupations: Novelist; critic
- Writing career
- Period: 2016–present
- Genres: Horror fiction, science fiction, film criticism

Gretchen Felker-Martin is an American horror author and film and TV critic. She wrote the novels Ego Homini Lupus, Manhunt, Cuckoo, and Black Flame.

== Personal life ==
Gretchen Felker-Martin grew up in rural New Hampshire. She was raised Baha'i, later becoming an atheist. She moved to Worcester, Massachusetts, in 2007. She is transgender and uses she/her pronouns.

== Career ==
Felker-Martin had film and TV criticism published in outlets such as Polygon and Time, and self-published several horror novellas starting in 2016. Felker-Martin's science fiction horror novel Manhunt was published on February 22, 2022, in the U.S. by Tor Nightfire. Manhunt appeared on best-of-year lists in multiple publications, including appearing at No. 1 in Vulture's list of "The Best Books of 2022". Roxane Gay selected it as one of the "25 Most Influential Works of Postwar Queer Literature", writing, "This is the kind of book that queer writers have been desperate to write forever and are rarely given the opportunity to". The Los Angeles Review of Books wrote, "Felker-Martin's horror novel cunningly weaves trans determinism, war, and trauma together in an effort to locate joy, empathy, and pleasure in a world on fire." In October 2024, Lilly Wachowski announced that she is adapting Manhunt into a TV series with Felker-Martin.

Her novel Cuckoo was published on June 11, 2024. In its first week it entered the USA Today best-seller list, and it was chosen as one of the "Best Horror Books of 2024 (So Far)" by Vulture. Publishers Weekly wrote, "Laying bare grief, terror, and the tenderness that makes it all matter, this is horror at its best." Also in June 2024, she wrote a short story in issue No. 41 of Harley Quinn.

In June 2025, DC Comics announced that Felker-Martin would write a Red Hood ongoing series for mature readers. On 10 September 2025, DC announced that they had canceled the Red Hood series just one day after its debut, following posts made by Felker-Martin on Bluesky regarding the assassination of Charlie Kirk including "Hope the bullet's okay after touching Charlie Kirk" and "Thoughts and prayers you Nazi bitch". DC said that the posts were "inconsistent with DC's standards of conduct". DC refunded retailers for every issue of the book that they had reserved for sale, including copies of the first issue that had already sold.

Black Flame was published on August 5, 2025. It was a USA Today best-seller, and was named by Them magazine as one of the Best LGBTQ+ Books of 2025. It won the 2025 Transfeminine Review Reader's Choice Award for Outstanding Horror. It was nominated for a British Fantasy Award in the Best Horror Novel category.

== Bibliography ==
=== Novels ===
- Ego Homini Lupus (2019)
- Manhunt (2022, Tor Nightfire)
- Cuckoo (2024, Tor Nightfire)
- Black Flame (2025, Tor Nightfire)
- Chimera (2026, Tor Nightfire)

=== Novellas ===
- No End Will be Found (2017)
- Dreadnought (2020)
- Wyrm (2024)

=== Short stories ===
- Sardines (2024), published in Bury Your Gays, by Sofia Ajram, ed.

=== Comic books ===
==== DC Comics ====
- Harley Quinn (vol. 4) #33 (back-up story: The Door, illustrated by Hayden Sherman, October 2023)
- Titans: Beast World Tour – Gotham #1 (story: Scavengers, illustrated by Ivan Shavrin, December 2023)
- DC Pride 2024 #1 (story: Marasmius, illustrated by Claire Roe, May 2024)
- Harley Quinn (vol. 4) #41 (back-up story: The Cave, illustrated by Dani, June 2024)
- Poison Ivy #25 (back-up story: Boots and Handbags, illustrated by Atagun Ilhan, September 2024)
- Red Hood #1 (illustrated by Jeff Spokes, September 2025)
