= Manhunt (novel) =

2022 book

- Author: Gretchen Felker-Martin
- Language: English
- Genre: Horror, post-apocalyptic fiction
- Published: 2022

Manhunt is a 2022 horror novel by American writer Gretchen Felker-Martin.

== Plot ==
The story is set in a post-apocalyptic world where individuals with a certain level of testosterone transform into monsters, leading to the widespread deaths of cisgender men. As a result, the world is inhabited primarily by cis women and by transgender and non-binary people.

The main protagonists are two trans women, Beth and Fran, who survive by hunting these transformed men. To avoid becoming monsters themselves, they extract the testicles of the men they kill in order to obtain estrogen, which not only allows them to continue their gender transition but also maintain their human form. In addition to the threat posed by the transformed men, the protagonists must defend themselves against militant TERF groups (trans-exclusionary radical feminists), who seek to eradicate trans people and consolidate their power.

Beth and Fran are joined by their former friend, Dr. Indiresh Varma, and a new companion, a trans man named Robbie, as they face the dangers of the world around them.

== Adaptation ==
In October 2024, director Lilly Wachowski, known for her work on the Matrix series, announced that she was developing a television adaptation of the novel along with Felker-Martin, writing that it would be "queer as hell".

== Reception ==
Liam McBain of NPR wrote, "Manhunt is a fresh, stomach-turning take on gendered apocalypse." Lee Mandelo, writing for Reactor Magazine, described the novel as a "brilliant and brutal piece of horror fiction". Manhunt appeared on best-of-year lists in multiple publications, including appearing at No. 1 in Vulture's list of "The Best Books of 2022". Roxane Gay selected it as one of the "25 Most Influential Works of Postwar Queer Literature", writing, "This is the kind of book that queer writers have been desperate to write forever and are rarely given the opportunity to".

In reaction to TERFs being portrayed as villains, and a scene where characters discuss a rumor of the accidental death of writer J. K. Rowling, Felker-Martin wrote that the book was targeted before and after its release by a campaign of review bombing on Amazon.com and Goodreads.

The success of the novel, selling more than 40,000 print copies as of 2026, was cited by Publishers Weekly as a foundational moment in trans horror becoming a mainstream publishing phenomenon.
