= St. Ignatius Hospital =

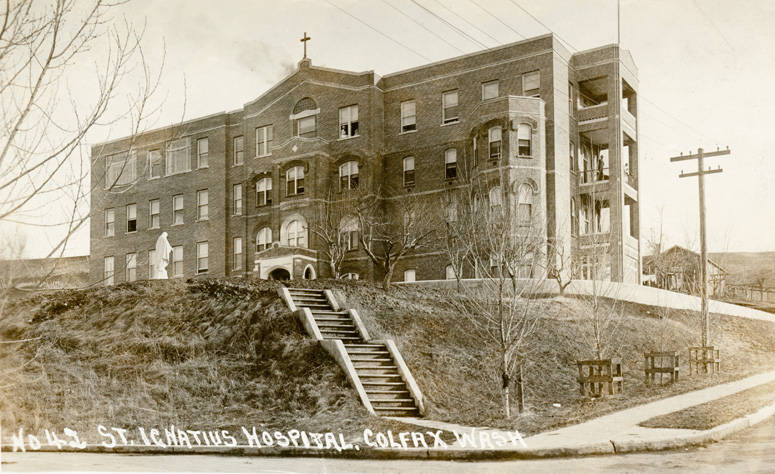
- St. Ignatius Hospital c. 1900

Geography
- Location: Colfax, Washington, United States
- Coordinates: 46.87103°N 117.36367°W

History
- Founded: 1892
- Closed: 1964

Links
- Lists: Hospitals in Washington state

St. Ignatius Hospital is a former manor hospital located in Colfax, Washington, United States. The first cornerstone of the hospital was laid in June of 1893 by the Sisters of Providence.

== History ==
The construction of St. Ignatius Hospital began in 1893 by the Sisters of Providence. The original brick building was completed in 1894. The surrounding community claimed it to be one of the best equipped institutions of its kind in the Pacific Northwest. During the first eighteen months of operation, the hospital catered to 145 total patients. 50 of these stays were privately funded, 84 were paid by the county, one stay was billed to the railroad and 10 were deemed charity cases.

The first cesarean section conducted by the hospital occurred in February 1915 on a mother and her ten-and-a-half-pound baby girl. Both the baby and mother recovered well.

By 1908, the hospital had achieved financial self-sufficiency, allowing for plans to expand the facility. Over the following years, additional funds were raised to support significant improvements, including the installation of an elevator, the construction of a laundry building, and the addition of a new east wing, which was completed in 1917 at a cost of approximately $17,500.

The expanded hospital accommodated patients across multiple floors: the second and third floors served as patient rooms, while the fourth floor housed the surgical department and living quarters for the sisters and nurses. A small chapel was also constructed in the northeast corner of the building. Further expansion continued in 1928 with the addition of a west wing. To support the hospital’s growing infrastructure, a separate heating plant was constructed east of the hospital, and in 1929, the main kitchen was enlarged with the installation of refrigeration.

By 1964, the hospital faced regulatory challenges when the health department announced that it would lose its license unless a complete reconstruction took place. To meet the necessary $1.2 million funding goal, a hospital board was established, and extensive fundraising efforts were launched. In 1965, the community secured a Hill-Burton grant for $400,000, while church groups, clubs, organizations, and private donors contributed $600,000. An additional $150,000 was raised through the sale of hospital equipment.

In November 1968, the newly constructed hospital was officially dedicated as Whitman Community Hospital. To honor those who contributed to its development, a commemorative book was placed in the front hall, listing the names of 2,700 individuals who had worked for, donated to, or played a role in the hospital’s construction.

When the hospital was shut down after the opening of Whitman Community Hospital. The property served as an assisted living home until 2000. In 2003, the building was officially shut down and abandoned.

In 2015, the hospital was opened for public tours, based on claims that the site is haunted. According to a 2017 report, the tours earned over $30,000 between 2015 and 2016, the proceeds of which go to the Colfax Chamber of Commerce.

In early 2021 the hospital was purchased yet again. The new owners are working on partially renovating the hospital for tours. The date of reopening is yet to be determined.

== In popular culture ==
The hospital was featured in an episode of the television series Paranormal Lockdown in 2017.

The paranormal reality television Ghost Adventures covered the story of the St. Ignatius Hospital, in the episode "St. Ignatius Hospital".

In 2022, the hospital was featured in two episodes of the docuseries Ghost Files on the YouTube channel Watcher by content creators Ryan Bergara, and Shane Madej featuring Garrett Watts; he spoke about his personal experience when visiting the hospital.
