= List of Worth It episodes =

Worth It is an American entertainment web series by BuzzFeed that premiered on September 18, 2016. In addition to the main show, there have been several spin-off series and related content.

== Episodes ==
Season	Episodes	Originally released	
Season	Episodes	First released	Last released
1	9	September 18, 2016	January 8, 2017
2	10	March 12, 2017	May 14, 2017
3	11	August 27, 2017	February 1, 2018
4	12	March 18, 2018	June 3, 2018
5	6	September 9, 2018	October 14, 2018
6	6	July 14, 2019	August 18, 2019
7	6	October 13, 2019	December 22, 2019
8	6	August 16, 2020	September 20, 2020
9	5	November 18, 2017	March 31, 2019
10	4	May 20, 2020	November 15, 2020
11	3	November 27, 2021	December 11, 2021
12	3	December 3, 2022	December 17, 2022
13	3	March 11, 2023	April 8, 2023

=== Season 1 (2016–2017) ===
No.	Episode	Notes	Steven’s Winner	Keith's Winner	Andrew's Winner	Adam's Winner	Evan's Winner
1	$3 Sushi vs. $250 Sushi	Co-starring Keith Habersberger instead of Andrew Ilnyckyj	$$$	$	--	--	--
2	$4 Burger vs. $777 Burger	Co-starring Keith Habersberger instead of Andrew Ilnyckyj; cinematography by Shane Madej; sound by Brian Wohl; filmed in Las Vegas.	$$	$$$	--	--	--
3	$5 Pizza vs. $135 Pizza	First episode starring Andrew Ilnyckyj. First episode in which Adam Bianchi's face is shown.	$$	--	$$	--	--
4	$11 Steak vs. $306 Steak		$$$	--	$$	$	--
5	$8 Pasta vs. $100 Pasta	Cameos by Ryan Bergara and Shane Madej in first three seconds of video.	$	--	$	$	--
6	$2 Hot Dog vs. $169 Hot Dog	Luxury location filmed in Seattle, WA.	$$$	--	$$	--	--
7	$8 Salmon vs $56 Salmon	Filmed in Seattle, WA.	$	--	$	--	--
8	$24 Korean BBQ vs $346 Korean BBQ	Guest starring Evan Ghang.	$	--	$$$	$$$	$$
9	$27 Cake vs. $1,120 Cake	N/A	$	--	$$	--	--

=== Season 2 (2017) ===
No.	Episode	Notes	Steven’s Winner	Andrew's Winner	Adam's Winner	Evan's Winner
1	$1 Donut vs. $100 Donut	N/A	$	$	$	--
2	$7 Buffet vs. $95 Buffet	Filmed in Las Vegas.	$$	$$$	$$$	--
3	$47 Taco vs. $1 Taco	Luxury location filmed in Las Vegas. Usual order is flipped, with the most expensive taco being tasted first and the cheapest last.	$	$$	$$	--
4	$1 Ice Cream vs $1,000 Ice Cream	Luxury location filmed in New York City.	$	$$	$$	--
5	$2 Pizza vs. $2,000 Pizza	Filmed in New York City, guest Mario Batali.	$$	$	$$	--
6	$4 Cheesecake vs. $70 Cheesecake	Filmed in New York City.	$$	$	$	--
7	$7 Secret Menu vs. $2,500 Secret Menu	Filmed in New York City.	$$	$$	$$	--
8	$6 Cocktail vs. $208 Cocktail	N/A	$$$	$$	$	--
9	$2 Egg vs. $95 Egg	N/A	$$	$	$$	--
10	$13 BBQ Ribs vs. $256 BBQ Ribs	Filmed in Seoul, South Korea, guests Evan Ghang and David Chang.	$$	$$	$$	$$$

=== Season 3 (2017–2018) ===
No.	Episode	Notes	Steven’s Winner	Andrew's Winner	Adam's Winner	Rie's Winner
1	$3 Mac 'N' Cheese vs. $195 Mac 'N' Cheese	Filmed in Los Angeles.	$	$$	$$	--
2	$7 BBQ Ribs vs. $68 BBQ Ribs	N/A	$$	$	$	--
3	$3 Seafood vs. $213 Seafood	Filmed in Sydney and Melbourne, Australia.	$$	$$	$$	--
4	$18 Wine vs. $1,000 Wine	Filmed in Nagambie, Avenel and Wahgunyah, Australia.	$$$	$$	$$	--
5	$16 Steak vs. $150 Steak	Filmed in Sydney, Melbourne and Darraweit Guim, Australia.	$$$	$$	$$	--
6	$17 Fried Chicken vs. $500 Fried Chicken	Guest David Chang, Marcus Samuelsson; filmed in New York City.	$$	$$$	$$$	--
7	$19 Brunch vs. $113 Brunch	N/A	$$	$	$$	--
8	$3 Ramen vs. $79 Ramen	Filmed in Tokyo, Japan, guest Rie McClenny.	$$	$$	$$	$
9	$1 Coffee vs. $914 Coffee	Filmed in Tokyo and Osaka, Japan, guest Rie McClenny; .	$	$$	$$	$$
10	$7 Cake vs. $208 Cake	Filmed in Osaka and Tokyo, Japan, guest starring Rie McClenny.	$$	$$	$$	$$
11	$10 Game Day Food vs. $456 Game Day Food	Filmed in Minneapolis; sponsored episode to promote NBC's Super Bowl 2018.	$$$	$$	$$$	--

=== Season 4 (2018) ===
No.	Episode	Notes	Steven’s Winner	Andrew's Winner	Adam's Winner	Quinta's Winner	Inga's Winner
1	$2 Bacon vs. $100 Bacon	Filmed in Palm Springs, Los Angeles, and New York City	$	$$	$	--	--
2	$1 Bagel vs. $1,000 Bagel	Filmed in New York City.	$	$	$$	--	--
3	$10 Vegan vs. $135 Vegan	Filmed in New York City.	$	$$$	$$$	--	--
4	$9 Fish vs. $140 Fish	Filmed in Honolulu, HI.	$	$$$	$$ (Dessert)	--	--
5	$5 Pie vs. $250 Pie	Middle and luxury locations filmed in Houston, TX. Vocal cameo by Ryan Bergara.	$$	$	$$	--	--
6	$7 Pho vs. $68 Pho	Affordable location filmed in Houston; middle location filmed in Honolulu; luxury location filmed in Las Vegas.	$	$$	$$	--	--
7	$12 Pork vs. $715 Pork	Guest Annie Jeong.	$	$$$	$$	--	--
8	$8 Toast vs. $20 Toast	Luxury location filmed in San Francisco.	$$$	$	$$	--	--
9	$15 Spaghetti vs. $143 Spaghetti	Affordable location filmed in San Francisco.	$	$	$	--	--
10	$3 Fries vs. $100 Fries	Middle and luxury locations filmed in Montreal, Canada.	$$	$	$$	--	--
11	$10 Cheesesteak vs.$120 Cheesesteak	Guest starring Quinta Brunson; filmed in Philadelphia.	$$	$$$	Other	$$	--
12	$2 Peking Duck vs $240 Peking Duck	Guest starring Inga Lam; filmed in New York City.	$$$	$	$	--	$

=== Season 5 (2018) ===
No.	Episode	Notes	Steven’s Winner	Andrew's Winner	Adam's Winner	Annie's Winner	Rie's Winner
1	$29 vs. $180 Family-Style Meats	Introducing Annie Jeong as co-producer.	$	$$	$$$	$$	--
2	$2 Curry vs. $75 Curry	Filmed in New York City.	$	$$	$$	$$$	--
3	$1 Cookie vs. $90 Cookie	Filmed in New York City and Japan; guests Rie McClenny and Shane Madej.	$$$	$	$$$	$$$	$$$
4	$1 Sushi vs. $133 Sushi	Filmed in Japan; guest Rie McClenny.	$$$	$$$	$$$	$	$$$
5	$1 Eggs Vs. $89 Eggs	Filmed in Japan; guest Rie McClenny.	$$	$$	$$	$$	$$
6	$6 Sandwich Vs. $180 Sandwich	Affordable location filmed in Nashville, TN; luxury location filmed in Japan; guest Rie McClenny; cameo appearance by Binging with Babish's Andrew Rea.	$	$$	$	$$	--

=== Season 6 (2019) ===
No.	Episode	Notes	Steven’s Winner	Andrew's Winner	Adam's Winner	Annie's Winner
1	$4 Burrito vs. $32 Burrito	Filmed in Los Angeles and Fresno, California.	$$$	$	$	$$
2	$3.50 Fish Tacos vs. $30 Fish Tacos	Filmed in Los Angeles.	$$	$$	$$	$
3	$13 Korean Soup vs. $88 Korean Soup	Filmed in Los Angeles.	$	$$	$$	$$
4	$11 Salad Vs. $95 Salad	Filmed in Los Angeles.	$	$	$$$ (Celery)	$$
5	$13 Lasagna vs. $60 Lasagna	Filmed in Los Angeles and Philadelphia.	$	$	$	$$$
6	$10 Sushi & Burger Vs. $58 Sushi & Burger	Filmed in Los Angeles and New York City.	$$$	$	$$ (Burger)/$$$ (Sushi)	$$$

=== Season 7 (2019) ===
No.	Episode	Notes	Steven’s Winner	Andrew's Winner	Adam's Winner	Annie's Winner	Inga's Winner	Jackson's Winner
1	$0.50 Dumpling Vs. $29 Dumplings	Filmed in Taiwan, guest Inga Lam.	$	$$	$$$	$	$	--
2	$3.50 Soup Vs. $29 Soup	Filmed in Taiwan, guest Inga Lam.	$$$	$	$$$	$$$	$$$	--
3	$3 Chicken Vs. $62 Chicken	Filmed in Taiwan, guest Inga Lam.	$$	$	$$	$$$	$$	--
4	$7 Double Cheeseburger Vs. $25 Double Cheeseburger	Filmed in Los Angeles, guest Jackson via Make-a-Wish Foundation.	$$	$$$	$	$	--	$$
5	$10 Noodles Vs. $94 Noodles	Filmed in Los Angeles.	$$	$$	$	$$$	--	--
6	$5 Fried Chicken Sandwich Vs. $20 Fried Chicken Sandwich	Filmed in Los Angeles.	$$	$	$$	--	--	--

=== Season 8 (2020) ===
No.	Episode	Notes	Steven’s Winner	Andrew's Winner	Adam's Winner
1	$4 Pancake vs. $88 Pancake	Filmed in Los Angeles, CA.	$$$	$$	$$$
2	$4 Rice Vs. $52 Rice	Filmed in Los Angeles, CA.	$	$$	$$$
3	$4 Breakfast Sandwich Vs. $30 Breakfast Sandwich	Filmed in Houston, TX and Dallas, TX.	$	$	$
4	$5 Carrot Vs. $20 Carrot	Filmed in Detroit, MI.	$	$$$	$
5	$4 Quesadilla Vs. $20 Quesadilla	Filmed in Los Angeles, CA.	$$	$$$	$
6	$128 Hot Pot Vs. $798 Meat Board	Filmed in New York City and Houston, TX. Only 2 locations instead of 3, both are luxury locations.	$$$ (Meat Board)	$$$ (Hot Pot)	$$$ (Meat Board)

=== Worth It: One Stop ===
No.	Episode	Notes
1	$1,977 Japanese Grapes	Guest starring Rie McClenny; filmed in Tokyo, Japan.
2	$210 7-Course Seafood Dinner	Filmed in Los Angeles.
3	$1,593 Bento Box • Japan	Guest starring Rie McClenny; filmed in Nikkō, Tochigi, Japan.
4	We Put Our Friend's Face On 3,500 Pieces of Candy	Guest starring Rie McClenny; filmed in Nagoya, Japan.
5	Eating A $132 Steak With A $950.01 Knife	Filmed in Hollywood, California.

=== Worth It: Social Distancing Edition ===
No.	Episode	Notes	Steven's Winner	Andrew's Winner	Adam's Winner
1	$3 Takeout Vs. $129 Takeout	Filmed in Los Angeles, CA.	--	--	--
2	$7 Picnic Vs. $323 Picnic	Filmed in Los Angeles, CA.	$	$$	$$
3	$1 Savory Pie Vs. $55 Savory Pie	Filmed in Los Angeles, CA.	$	$$	$$
4	$18 Oil Vs. $60 Oil	Filmed in Los Angeles, CA.	$$	$	$$

=== Worth It: About To Eat — 2021 ===
No.	Episode	Notes	Steven's Winner	Andrew's Winner	Adam's Winner
1	$6 Sauce Vs. $185 Sauce	Filmed in Los Angeles, CA.	$	$$$	$
2	$20 Whole Chicken Vs. $78 Whole Chicken	Filmed in Los Angeles, CA.	$$	$	$$$
3	$4 Dessert Vs. $235 Dessert	Filmed in Los Angeles, CA.	$$	$$$	$

=== Worth It: About To Eat — 2022 ===
No.	Episode	Notes	Steven's Winner	Andrew's Winner	Adam's Winner
1	$13 Shrimp Vs. $27 Shrimp	Filmed in New Orleans, LA.	$$	$$$	$
2	$4 Pork Vs. $19 Pork	Filmed in Raleigh, NC, Charleston, SC, and New Orleans, LA.	$$	$$	$$
3	$14 Seafood Vs. $48 Seafood	Filmed in Durham, NC and Wilmington, NC.	$$$	$	$

=== Worth It: About To Eat — 2023 ===
No.	Episode	Notes	Steven's Winner	Andrew's Winner	Adam's Winner	Simu's Winner
1	$2 Beef Patty Vs. $689 Lobster Tower	Guest starring Simu Liu; Filmed in Toronto, ON, Canada.	$$	$$$	$	$$$
2	$20 Wine Pairing Vs. $260 Wine Pairing	Filmed in Los Angeles, CA and Los Alamos, CA.	$$	$$$	$	--
3	$9 Sandwich Vs. $150 4-Course Dinner: Worth It Revisits	Filmed in Los Angeles, CA and Carlsbad, CA.	$$	$	Friends we made along the way	--

== Worth It: Lifestyle Episodes ==
=== One-Off Episodes ===
No.	Episode	Links	Description	Notes
1	$12 Date Vs. $576 Date	Episode	"That's the definition of romance." Sponsored By McDonald’s All Day Breakfast.	Hosted by Steven Lim; featuring Safiya Nygaard and her (then) boyfriend Tyler Williams.
2	$1,000 Tattoo - Worth It Tattoos • Part 2	Episode	Ben Coleman returns for a bonus episode of Worth It Lifestyle: One Stop! Now that's refreshing.	Hosted by Steven Lim and Ben Coleman.
3	Traveling To 7 Countries In 7 Days For $524	Episode	"What do you call an autotune artist in a storm? T-Rain."	Hosted by Steven Lim and Ben Coleman.

=== Regular Episodes ===
Season	Episodes	Originally released	
Season	Episodes	First released	Last released
1	6	January 8, 2017	May 23, 2017
2	6	August 27, 2017	October 1, 2017
3	6	May 13, 2018	June 17, 2018
4	6	April 14, 2019	June 16, 2019

=== Season 1 (2017) ===
Season 1
No.	Episode	Links	Description	Notes
1	$80 Tattoo vs. $875 Tattoo	Episode	"I'm not gonna be able to hide this from my grandma."	Hosted by Steven Lim and Ben Coleman; cinematography & sound by Jared Sosa.
2	$100 Sneakers vs. $25,000 Sneakers	Episode	"That's a $100 step right there!"	Hosted by Steven Lim and Ryan Bergara; cinematography & sound by Alex Choi.
3	$50 Hotel vs. $35,000 Hotel	Episode	"That’s like 17,000 large fries from McDonalds."	Hosted by Steven Lim and Selorm Kploanyi; cinematography & sound by Kevin Nguyen.
4	$568K House vs. $10 million House	Episode	"You can house a whole baseball team and the managing staff in here?!"	Hosted by Keith Habersberger and Quinta Brunson; cinematography & sound by Kevin Nguyen.
5	$39 Massage vs. $490 Massage	Episode	"I have no idea what's happening to my body right now."	Hosted by Michelle Khare and Jordan Shalhoub; featuring Steven Lim and Jen Ruggerillo; cinematography & sound by a man and a woman, uncredited in the video.
6	$22 Adrenaline Date vs. $1,160 Adrenaline Date	Episode	"There's no better way to get to know somebody than to smack them with a ball at high velocity, right?" Andy Cohen hosts the dating show that started it all! Premieres Thursday, May 25 at 9|8c on FOX.	Hosted by Steven Lim and Ryan Bergara; featuring Helen Pan (Bergara's girlfriend); sponsored by Love Connection.

=== Season 2 (2017) ===
No.	Episode	Links	Description	Notes
1	$25,000 Car vs. $503,000 Car	Episode	"Will I Turn Into A Fancy Boy?"	Hosted by Steven Lim and Evan Ghang; cinematography by Alex Choi. Choi is the cinematographer for all of Season 2.
2	$5 Video Game vs $70,000 Video Game	Episode	We travelled from LA to Tennessee to play the world's most expensive video game.	Hosted by Steven Lim and Branden Smith. Luxury location filmed in Tennessee.
3	$15 Haircut vs. $500 Haircut	Episode	"This is the most extreme haircut I could ever dream of."	Hosted by Steven Lim and Kwesi James. Luxury location filmed in San Antonio.
4	$1,700 Apartment vs $40,000 Apartment	Episode	"Babe. I got this spot."	Hosted by Steven Lim and Ben Coleman. Filmed in New York City.
5	$139 Plane Seat vs. $24,000 Plane Seat	Episode	"I could join the mile high club with this seat."	Hosted by Steven Lim and Ben Coleman.
6	$399 Suit vs $7,900 Suit	Episode	"I'd like a suit for my wedding..."	Hosted by Steven Lim and Evan Ghang. Filmed in New York.

=== Season 3 (2018) ===
#	Episode	Links	Description	Notes
1	$17 Pet vs. $100,000 Pet	Episode	"Who is Lennox and why is he so special?"	Hosted by Steven Lim and Niki Ang; cinematography & sound by Alex Choi.
2	$600 Boat vs. $41 million Boat	Episode	"I think I've gotten all of my adrenaline out for the day."	Hosted by Steven Lim and Selorm Kpoayni.
3	$150 Bed vs. $159,000 Bed	Episode	"What pyjamas are you rockin'?"	Hosted by Steven Lim and Zach Kornfeld.
4	$40 Gym vs. $10,000 Gym	Episode	"I feel like we are in a secret society."	Hosted by Steven Lim and Kate Reynolds.
5	$285 Watch vs. $700,000 Watch	Episode	"It's like Santa's Elves, living in this tiny watch."	Hosted by Steven Lim and Ben Coleman.
6	$825K Beach House vs. $14.9 Million Beach House	Episode	"You could break up and still coexist in this house because there's two of everything."	Hosted by Steven Lim and Ben Coleman.

=== Season 4 (2019) ===
#	Episode	Links	Description	Notes
1	$36 Backpack vs. $990 Backpack	Episode	It has all the essentials! A protractor set, tampons and a laptop! For exceptional vacations, you’re gonna need an exceptional backpack.	Hosted by Steven Lim and Jennifer Ruggirello.
2	$199 Chair vs. $9,800 Chair	Episode	"This is the LeBron of chairs!"	Hosted by Steven Lim and Andrew Ilnyckyj.
3	$50,000 Tiny House vs. $165,000 Tiny House	Episode	"The introvert in me is loving this."	Hosted by Steven Lim and Curly Velasquez; Andrew Ilnyckyj as lead producer.
4	$8 Kitchen Knife vs. $800 Kitchen Knife	Episode	"It feels really satisfying to have my force transmitted so easily..."	Hosted by Steven Lim and Rie McClenny.
5	$49 Headphones vs. $2,695 Headphones	Episode	"We used to put the radio on the coop."	Hosted by Steven Lim, Joyce Louis-Jean, and Annie Jeong; Andrew Ilnyckyj as lead producer.
6	$1,065 Engagement Ring Vs. $55,000 Engagement Ring	Episode	Protip: Do not tell them you got a good deal.	Hosted by Steven Lim and Kristin Chirico.

== Worth It: UK Episodes ==
Season	Episodes	Originally released	
Season	Episodes	First released	Last released
1	6	September 28, 2017	December 3, 2017

=== Season 1 (2017) ===
Season 1
No.	Episode	Links	Description	Notes
1	£4 Curry vs. £210 Curry	Episode		Hosted by Charles and Reid.
2	70p Tea vs. £80 Tea	Episode	"I have about 20 cups a day..."	Hosted by Ada and Reid.
3	£5 Kebab vs. £925 Kebab	Episode	You're out, you've had a few to drink, what do you do?! Kebab!	Hosted by Nick and Reid.
4	£21.50 Afternoon Tea vs. £144 Afternoon Tea	Episode	"It's pronounced scooones!"	Hosted by Adaeze and Reid.
5	£1.95 Chocolate vs. £300 Chocolate	Episode	"I feel like im touching gold."	Hosted by Evelyn and Reid.
6	£4 Fish And Chips vs. £50 Fish And Chips	Episode	"I need to respect the batter."	Hosted by Joseph Bor and Reid.
