= Puppet History =

Web series by Watcher

- Also known as: Puppet University
- Genre: Game show
- Created by: Shane Madej
- Written by: Shane Madej; Garrett Werner
- Starring: Shane Madej; Ryan Bergara
- Original language: English
- No. of seasons: 7

Production
- Executive producers: Shane Madej; Ryan Bergara; Steven Lim
- Producer: Lizzie Lockard
- Running time: 25-45 minutes
- Production company: Watcher Entertainment

Original release
- Network: YouTube
- Release: January 10, 2020

Puppet History is an American educational comedy game show YouTube series created by Shane Madej and produced by Madej, Ryan Bergara, and Steven Lim. The show premiered on January 10, 2020, on the Watcher Entertainment YouTube channel.

The show's premise sees a colorful puppet called the Professor presenting a game show about one or two distinctive persons or events from history. The two contestants answer questions, and the Professor gives them points; the contestant with the most points wins the title of "History Wizard" and a hat. Before season six, the contestant with the most points won the title of "History Master" and a small trophy.

The show received an Honoree Award at the 2022 Webby Awards for a Science & Education Channel.

In 2026, Puppet History videos were moved onto a new channel dedicated entirely to the show called Puppet History Inc. A series of shorter videos called History Contingency Tapes were uploaded on the new channel.

== Format ==
The show begins with the Professor, a blue puppet played by Shane Madej, greeting the guests from a puppet theater. The contestants are almost always Ryan Bergara and another special guest. The Professor then tells a story about a historical event or figure, stopping intermittently to pose questions with the contestants; whoever writes the correct answer on their dry-erase board, receives points (in the form of jelly beans).

The show presents parts of the story and answers to some questions through reenactments of scenes using paper cutouts of people from history.' The scoring is loose, and a contestant may be awarded less than one point or negative points ("rotten jelly beans") for their answer, as well as extra points being awarded on a whim.

The Professor is often more affectionate towards the guests than to Bergara, often awarding them points for telling jokes or making drawings. Before the end of the show, the Professor leaves to "tally the score", where other puppets come on stage and sing a song about the historical event. The process of declaring winner is often manipulated in some way to drive the plot of the show.

== Cast and characters ==
- Shane Madej as the Professor, various puppets, genie, and himself.
- Ryan Bergara as himself
- Joyce Louis-Jean as Dinosara (season 5–7), a Tyrannosaurus rex and mother of the Professor.
- Garrett Watts as Dinosir (season 5–7), a Pteranodon and father of the Professor.
- Sam Reich as Pythagoras (season 7)

== Plot ==
In certain episodes in seasons 1 to 3, the Professor would sometimes reveal aspects of his life through wildly incorrect answers to the multiple choice questions. These answers detail the Professor's discovery of a magic lamp that had a fickle genie inside of it. He wished for the genie to turn a "seemingly ordinary household object," revealed to be the Professor's satchel, into a secret time machine. The genie did so, but was also "a total prick about it", chasing the Professor through time. Objects the Professor touched were transformed into the various musical puppets seen in the show.

In season 4, the Professor reveals he has placed a restraining order on the genie and there will be no genie lore. Throughout the season, previous puppets reappear on the "Jelly Telly" to pose questions and announce their plans to throw a party for the Professor. In the finale, the puppet party is suddenly invaded by the genie. The Professor is possessed by the demon Asmodeus, who forces him to wish to be transported to the Cretaceous period. The Professor falls through a portal and is eaten by a Tyrannosaurus rex, canonically dying. It is revealed that Ryan made a deal with Asmodeus, Satan, and the genie to banish the Professor to the Cretaceous period so he could win finally win the series. In the Puppet History Holiday Spectacular, the puppets killed at the party are trapped in a theatre in Purgatory and sing an elegy to the Professor.

In season 5, the Professor is somehow alive, and the puppet theater is connected to a mysterious electronic box. In the Cretaceous period, an egg birthed by the Tyrannosaurus rex hatches, revealing a much larger Professor who has been infused with dinosaur DNA. At Watcher Entertainment, the Professor reveals himself to be an evil hologram sent from Purgatory. He announces his plans of skinning Ryan and wearing his flesh in order to rub the genie lamp and wish for world domination. The Professor performs an episode to his dinosaur parents just before the Chixulub impactor is about to strike and kill them. Ryan fights with the hologram Professor and rubs the magic lamp to bring the Professor and his dinosaur parents to the modern day. Ryan kills the hologram by defenestration.

In season 7, the Professor replaces the prize with amnesiac pills named "Phorgedytol" due to a "sponsorship deal". A puppet named Dr. Hoagy Sprat. introduces himself to the Professor as from the Department of Puppet Safety. Estranged producer Shane is shown warning the Professor about "treacherous forces" that could threaten his life, before being "murdered in the street like a dog." The culprit is revealed to be Elmer Walter Williams, a horse who is attempting to marry Dorothy Ruth, widow of the deceased Stanley Melvin Murphy who drowned in the Boston Molasses Flood. The Phorgetydol leads Ryan and the Professor to forget about the murder of Shane. Dorothy Ruth meets Elmer and eats pasta laced with the drug, causing her to forget about breaking up with him and marry him. Ryan then discovers that the effects of Phorgedytol are reversed by taking the pill twice a day. The Professor and Ryan travel to the set of Ghost Files and speak to Shane's ghost, only to realize that he does not believe in ghosts and thinks he is still alive. Shane reveals his murderer was Elmer Walter Williams. Elmer is found with a briefcase full of money and is about to be drowned in molasses by Ryan and the Professor. However, Dr. Hoagy Sprat explains that Elmer Walter Williams was never alive and was a puppet he bought at a store. Hoagy Sprat reveals himself to be the puppet of the ancient mathematician Pythagoras, having uncovered the key to immortality via the power of mathematics. Envious of the Professor, he vowed to establish himself as a superior genius by taking over the show. Professor and Ryan are retired to Purgatory and Pythagoras takes over the show. While sifting through the garbage, a plague rat accidentally revives the evil hologram Professor.

== Episodes ==
Series	Episodes	Originally released	
Series	Episodes	First released	Last released
1	4	10 January 2020	22 May 2020
2	9 (Note: Including a Christmas episode.)	14 August 2020	2 October 2020
3	6	12 March 2021	23 April 2021
4	7	27 August 2021	3 October 2021
5	6	11 November 2022	16 December 2022
6	6	7 July 2023	21 August 2023
7	6	8 February 2025	14 March 2025

=== Season 1 (2020) ===
No. overall	No. in season	Title	Guest contestant	Original release date
1	1	"Life During the Black Death Pandemic"	Steven Lim	January 10, 2020
2	2	"Stealing the World's Most Expensive Necklace"	Kate Peterman	February 28, 2020
3	3	"Surviving The Titanic: History's Luckiest Woman"	Jenny Lorenzo	April 10, 2020
4	4	"The Dancing Plague"	Jermaine Fowler	May 22, 2020

=== Season 2 (2020) ===
No. overall	No. in season	Title	Guest contestant	Original release date
5	1	"How America's First Female Detective Saved Abe Lincoln"	Kate Peterman	August 14, 2020
6	2	"The Terrifying Eruption of Mt. Vesuvius"	Matt Real	August 21, 2020
7	3	"Hatshepsut: The Forgotten Pharaoh"	Ryann Graham	August 28, 2020
8	4	"The Disastrous 1904 Olympic Marathon"	Kristin Chirico	September 4, 2020
9	5	"Isaac Newton's Nemesis"	Keith Habersberger	September 11, 2020
10	6	"The World's Greatest/Rudest Samurai"	Garrick Bernard	September 18, 2020
11	7	"Policarpa: The Revolutionary Teen Spy"	Curly Velasquez	September 25, 2020
12	8	"The Grim Journey of The Donner Party"	Joyce Louis-Jean	October 2, 2020
13	9 (Note: Christmas special)	"The Story of St. Nicholas"	Kate Peterman	December 25, 2020

=== Season 3 (2021) ===
No. overall	No. in season	Title	Guest contestant	Original release date
14	1	"The Beast of Gevaudan"	Sara Rubin	March 12, 2021
15	2	"The War of the Golden Stool"	Kate Peterman	March 26, 2021
16	3	"Ziryab: The World's First Rock Star"	Zach Kornfeld	April 2, 2021
17	4	"The Affair of the Poisons"	Garrick Bernard	April 9, 2021
18	5	"Ching Shih: The Pirate Queen"	Joyce Louis-Jean	April 16, 2021
19	6	"The Great Molasses Flood"	Garrett Watts	April 23, 2021

=== Season 4 (2021) ===
No. overall	No. in season	Title	Guest contestant	Original release date
20	1	"The Great Emu War"	Kate Peterman	August 27, 2021
21	2	"Mansa Musa: The Richest Man Who Ever Lived"	Ify Nwadiwe	September 3, 2021
22	3	"America vs. Smallpox: How Vaccines Saved the Nation"	Jermaine Fowler	September 10, 2021
23	4	"José Rizal: The Philippines' Reluctant Revolutionary"	Josh Weinstein	September 17, 2021
24	5	"The Bloody Revenge of Saint Olga of Kiev"	Selorm Kploanyi	September 24, 2021
25	6	"The Demonic Possessions of Loudun"	Sara Rubin	October 3, 2021
26	7	"The Puppet History Holiday Spectacular! (Note: This episode was a memorial service for the Professor featuring most of the singing puppets from previous episodes.)"	–	December 24, 2021

=== Season 5 (2022) ===
No. overall	No. in season	Title	Guest contestant	Original release date
27	1	"How Hippo Meat Almost Saved America"	Sara Rubin	November 11, 2022
28	2	"The Defenestrations of Prague"	Brian David Gilbert	November 18, 2022
29	3	"The Vietnamese Sisters Who Fought An Empire"	Maya Murillo	November 25, 2022
30	4	"America's First Black Aviatrix"	Ryann Graham	December 2, 2022
31	5	"The Bloody Life of England's Fastest Surgeon"	Aria Inthavong	December 9, 2022
32	6	"The Dreadful Demise of the Dinosaurs"	Dinosara and Dinosir (Note: Puppets voiced by Joyce Louis-Jean and Garrett Watts respectively. The episode does not feature Ryan Bergara as a contestant.)	December 16, 2022

=== Season 6 (2023) ===
No. overall	No. in season	Title	Guest contestant	Original release date
33	1	"The Unkillable Weirdo Who Invented The Saxophone"	Steven Lim	July 7, 2023
34	2	"The Mistress Who Murdered Her Way To The Throne"	Joyce Louis-Jean	July 14, 2023
38	3	"The Fiery Sports Riot That Nearly Destroyed Constantinople"	Ricky Wang	July 21, 2023
35	4	"The Scandalous Life of France's Bisexual Opera Icon"	Kwesi James	July 28, 2023
36	5	"How a Pope's Nepobaby Became One of the Worst Tyrants in History"	Zach Kornfeld	August 4, 2023
37	6	"The Deadly Race to the South Pole"	Sara Rubin	August 11, 2023

=== Season 7 (2025) ===
No. overall	No. in season	Title	Guest contestant	Original release date
39	1	"Pythagoras' Weird Math Cult"	Aria Inthavong	February 7, 2025
40	2	"Violent Riots over a Hat?"	Brennan Lee Mulligan	February 14, 2025
41	3	"How a Concubine Captured a King & Founded a Dynasty"	Claudia Restrepo	February 21, 2025
42	4	"A Pianist So Hot He Drove People Crazy"	Reece Feldman	February 28, 2025
43	5	"How a Sheep Thief Became A Royal Jester"	Alex Song-Xia	March 7, 2025
44	6	"The Doomed Castaways of the HMS Wager"	Sara Rubin	March 14, 2025
