= Brian Gilbert =

Brian Gilbert may refer to:

- Brian Gilbert (director), English film director
- Brian Gilbert (tennis) (1887–1974), English tennis player
- Brian David Gilbert, American performer, musician, and comedian
