= Duck Detective: The Secret Salami =

2024 video game

- From left to right: Manfred Ernst, Sophie Wintheimer, Eugene McQuacklin, Freddy Frederson, Laura Angst
- Developer: Happy Broccoli Games
- Publishers: Happy Broccoli Games (PC/console); Snapbreak (mobile)
- Director: Annika Maar
- Designers: Annika Maar; Joni Levinkind
- Programmer: Joni Levinkind
- Artists: Annika Maar; Caroline Buchmann
- Writer: Annika Maar
- Composer: Svyatoslav Petrov
- Engine: Unity
- Platforms: Android; Linux; iOS; macOS; Nintendo Switch; PlayStation 5; Windows; Xbox One; Xbox Series X/S
- Release: Nintendo Switch, Xbox, Linux, macOS, Windows: WW: May 23, 2024; Android, iOS: WW: April 9, 2025; PlayStation 5: WW: May 22, 2025
- Genre: Adventure
- Mode: Single-player

Duck Detective: The Secret Salami is a 2024 adventure game developed and published by Berlin-based Happy Broccoli Games. It is a comedic detective story where players control a duck detective, Eugene McQuacklin, and investigate a case of stolen salami in the office of a branch of a bus company. Players investigate the scene to find clues and receive words. These words are used to make "deducktions": phrasal templates where words are inserted into Eugene's notebook. It released for Linux, macOS, Windows, Nintendo Switch and Xbox consoles on May 23, 2024, for iOS and Android in collaboration with Snapbreak on April 9, 2025, and for the PlayStation 5 on May 22, 2025.

Annika Maar, the director, had the idea to make a game titled "Duck Detective" after Gamescom 2023. After a publisher pulled out of funding Happy Broccoli Games, Duck Detective: The Secret Salami was developed and published in six months so they would not go bankrupt. Adventure and puzzle games like Return of the Obra Dinn and The Case of the Golden Idol served as inspiration; the "deducktion" mechanic was "stole[n]" from The Case of the Golden Idol, according to Maar. The detective aesthetic was inspired by the Sherlock Holmes video game series, and the setting was inspired by Maar's experience working as customer service for a bus company.

Duck Detective: The Secret Salami received generally positive reviews; while critical reception to the gameplay and short length was mixed, the plot, humor, characters, and art were generally praised. It was nominated for the 2024 Golden Joystick Awards in the Best Indie Game - Self Published category. It was also nominated for Best Audio Design and Best Mobile Game for the 2025 Deutscher Computerspielpreis, and won in the Best Mobile Game category.

A standalone sequel, Duck Detective: The Ghost of Glamping, was announced in December 2024 and released in May 2025.

== Gameplay ==
Duck Detective: The Secret Salami is an adventure game presented in an isometric perspective; the characters are two-dimensional and have a white outline, while the environment is three-dimensional. Players control a duck detective, Eugene McQuacklin, in a city where all the residents are animals. It is fully voice acted, and there is a button that makes Eugene quack.

Close-up of the "deducktion" mechanic. This is the first "deducktion" players make; that Eugene is broke because he has spent all of his money on bread.

In a manner similar to The Case of the Golden Idol, players solve puzzles, called "deducktions", in the form of phrasal templates where the correct words must be inserted into Eugene's notebook. Investigating the scene gives the clues and the words needed to fill the notebook. After the sentence is fully filled, an approximate amount of incorrect words is revealed, unless "Story Mode" is activated, in which case the incorrect words are highlighted.

Scene investigation takes the form of moving around the rooms, interrogating non-player characters, and inspecting objects and characters with a magnifying glass. Occasionally, players must solve miniature puzzles to progress, such as figuring out the password to a safe. There is a hint button in case the player is stuck.

Though the solution to the mystery is always the same, players can choose how to end the game. After completion, players can see what percentage of people made each choice. The game takes two to three hours to complete.

== Cast and characters ==
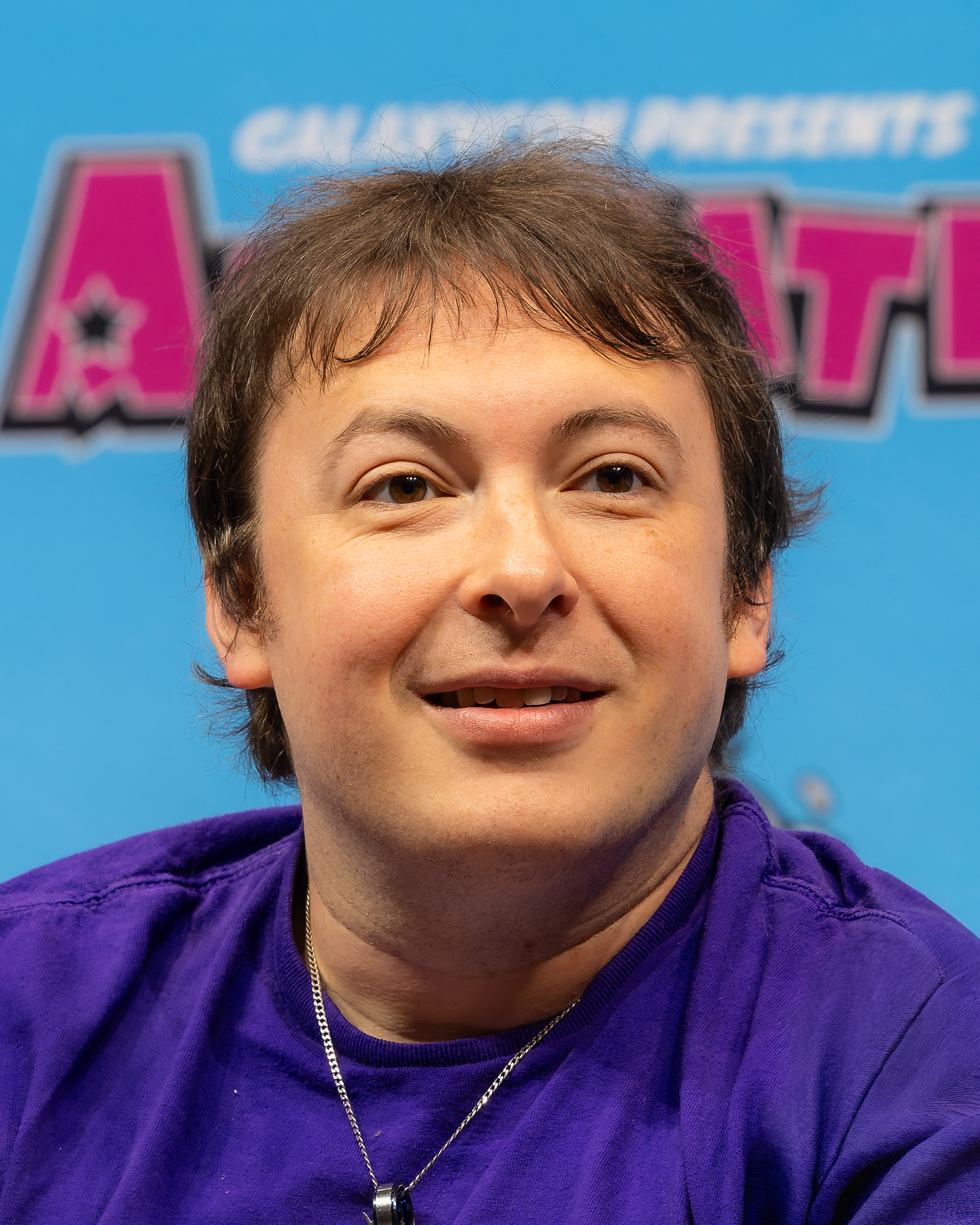
Sean Chiplock, the voice of Eugene McQuacklin

- Sean Chiplock as Eugene McQuacklin: a down-on-his-luck duck detective
- Annika Maar as Sophie Wintheimer: a depressed giraffe
- Brian David Gilbert as Freddy Frederson: a crocodile obsessed with detectives
- Lizzie Freeman as Laura Angst: an overworked cat
- Nola Klop as Margaret Whitlock: a motherly sheep
- Shane Mullan as Rufus Sederis: a practical penguin
- Dashawn Ricks as Manfred Ernst: a bear and a family man
- Cyrus Nemati as Boris Petrovic: a naive bull

== Plot summary ==
Eugene McQuacklin is a detective who is recently divorced, broke, and addicted to white bread. Laura Angst hires him to investigate a case at a branch of BearBus. When Eugene arrives, no one, including Laura, wants to talk to him. Eugene has to figure out the identities of BearBus's employees. Sophie Wintheimer is the receptionist; Manfred Ernst is the branch manager; Freddy Frederson works in the operating office; Laura and Margaret Whitlock work in customer service; Rufus Sederis is the janitor; and Boris Petrovic is the bus driver.

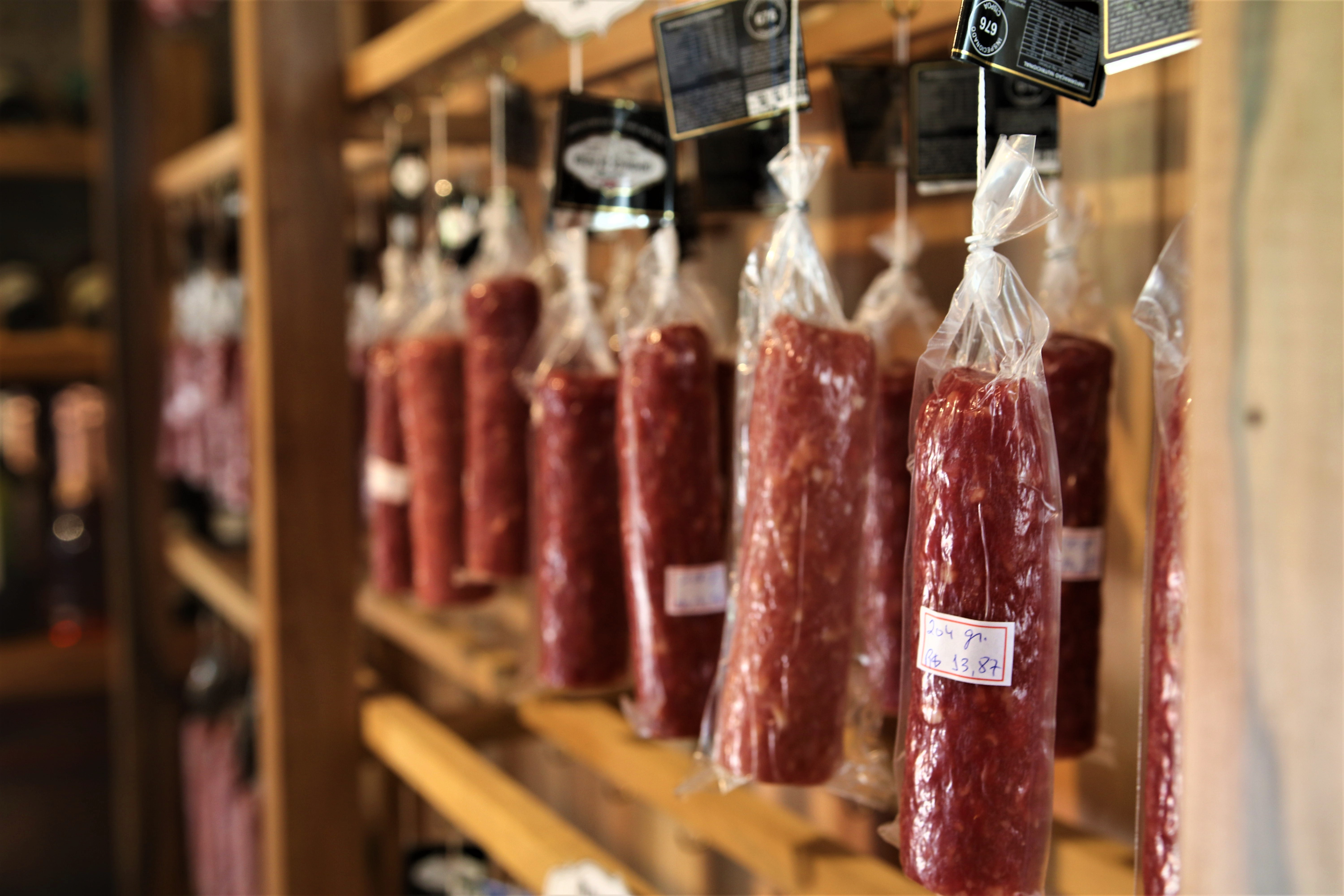
Packages of salami, similar to the ones being smuggled

After this, Laura explains her case to Eugene. A co-worker, known only as "The Salami Bandit", stole her lunch. She strongly suspects Freddy of the crime, as his bag is full of salami. Eugene realizes that Freddy had taken the wrong bag, and is being framed because of it. Meanwhile, Margaret hosts a surprise birthday party for Sophie. She opens her presents, and one of them is packages of salami with a threatening message attached. The employees' suspicions immediately turn on Freddy.

Eugene realizes that there is a criminal conspiracy: salami is being smuggled into the country using BearBus's busses. He gathers all of the BearBus employees, except for Sophie, who is missing, and explains this to them. No one takes him seriously, and they leave. A note at Sophie's desk is discovered, saying that she has quit BearBus.

Eugene begins to unravel the case. Manfred's branch had its budget cut, and so he devised the criminal conspiracy, and became The Salami Bandit, to make a better living for his family. Boris is an unwitting accomplice of Manfred's, as he is the only one capable of importing the salami. Sophie is another accomplice, who convinced Boris to join the conspiracy with a false story. Eugene discovers another criminal conspiracy: Margaret produces bus vouchers to give to Rufus, who sells them illegally. Rufus knew that Manfred was the Salami Bandit, and used this knowledge to blackmail him and make sure he did not talk about the voucher selling.

Eugene realizes that when he arrived at the scene, Sophie attempted to confess the conspiracy to the police, but Manfred held her captive in one of BearBus's busses before she could. He frees Sophie from the bus, and everyone else comes to them. Eugene explains the case, and afterwards, the player is given the choice to arrest (or not arrest) one or more of Manfred, Sophie, or Boris.

In a post-credits scene, Eugene realizes he forgot to collect his payment from Laura, and is unable to pay for the bus ride back home. Freddy, waiting outside, offers Eugene a ride back to his office. Eugene, with much reluctance, agrees. During the drive, Freddy offers to be Eugene's sidekick. Eugene doesn't respond.

== Development ==
Developer Happy Broccoli Games is based in Berlin, Germany. In September 2020, they were funded by Coffee Stain Studios as part of its Levelling the Playing Field initiative, which funds studios with "teams that are 50% women, non-binary individuals, or individuals from a variety of backgrounds and cultures". Their first game, Kraken Academy, was released in 2021.

Annika Maar, the director, had the idea to make a game titled "Duck Detective" after Gamescom 2023. After "the publisher that originally was interested in funding [Happy Broccoli Games] was not anymore", they had to drop their planned project, Odyssey Island, which they were developing along with Duck Detective: The Secret Salami. Without funding, Duck Detective: The Secret Salami was developed and published in six months so Happy Broccoli Games would not go bankrupt.

Adventure and puzzle games like Return of the Obra Dinn (2018) and The Case of the Golden Idol (2022) served as inspiration, and the detective aesthetic was inspired by the Sherlock Holmes video game series. The setting and plot twist were inspired by Maar's experience working as customer service for a bus company. Maar said the "deducktion" mechanic was "stole[n]" from The Case of the Golden Idol, and that Happy Broccoli Games wanted to create a more casual take on what they felt was a very serious and difficult game. Joni Levinkind, designer and programmer, described Duck Detective: The Secret Salami as a "mashup" of its inspirations.

The aims for the game were: to have plot twists; to have the player figure out the twists by themselves; and to make a cozy and casual game. To achieve the first aim, the game was written to misdirect the player by showing them a plot unrelated to the actual plot. In addition, a subplot connected to the main plot was included as a sort of red herring.

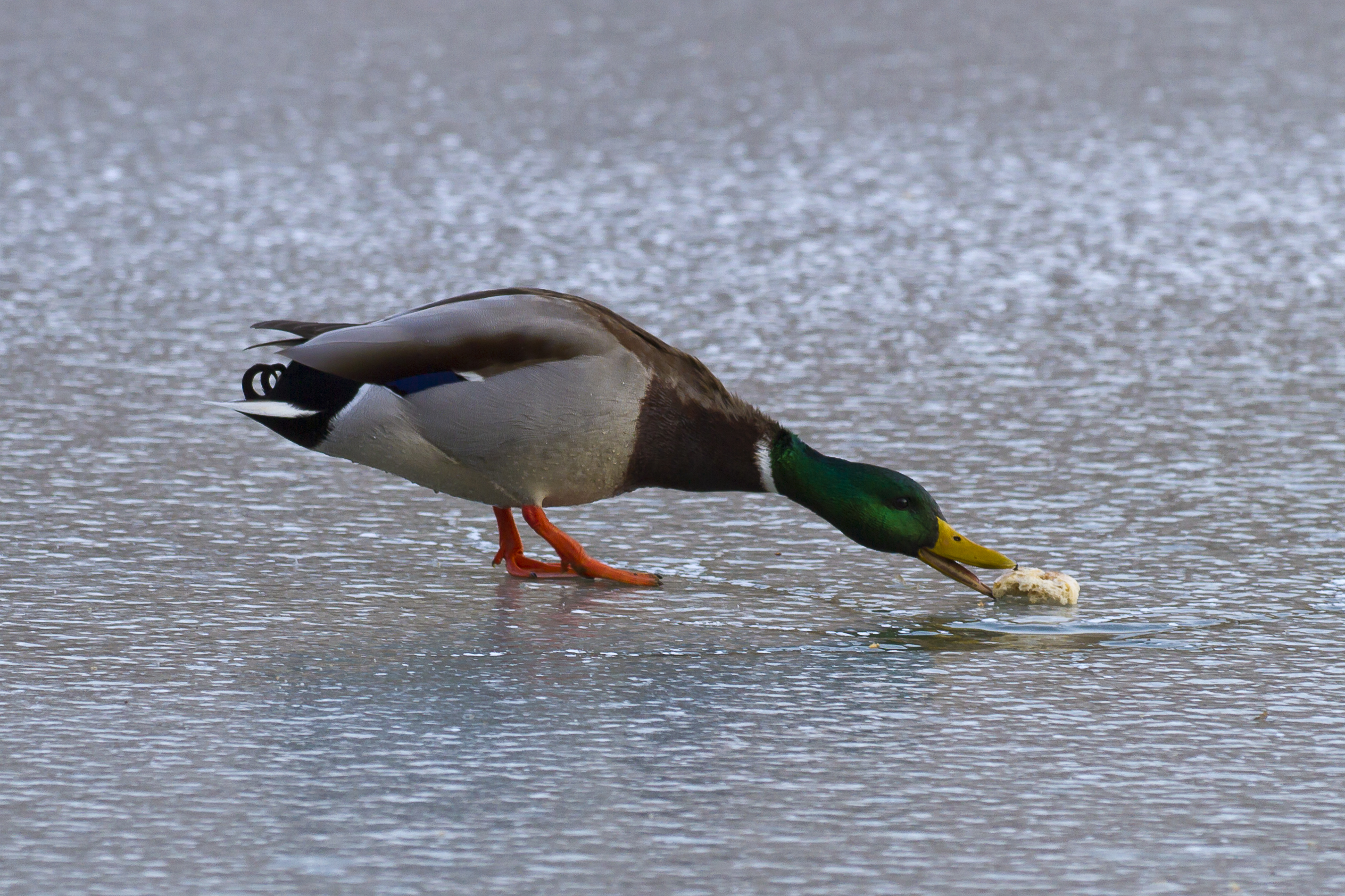
Bread is unhealthy for ducks.

Speaking on the art direction, a balance was sought between being cute and wholesome and not being seen as aimed towards children. To maintain this balance, a deep voice was sought for Eugene McQuacklin, and the story begins with his addiction to white bread. On the other hand, they avoided profanity, and despite the film noir atmosphere, they cut ashtrays and alcohol from the environments.

== Release ==
Duck Detective: The Secret Salami was announced in December 2023 at Wholesome Snack, an indie game showcase. Marketing and public relations were provided by Future Friends Games. It released for Linux, macOS, Windows, Nintendo Switch and Xbox consoles on May 23, 2024. In September 2024, a limited physical release of 4000 copies for the Nintendo Switch was published by Super Rare Games. It was ported to iOS and Android in collaboration with Snapbreak on April 9, 2025, and to the PlayStation 5 on May 22, 2025.

== Reception ==
Reception

Aggregate scores
Aggregator	Score
Metacritic	79/100
OpenCritic	74% recommend

Review scores
Publication	Score
Destructoid	5.5/10
Hardcore Gamer	4.0/5
Nintendo World Report	8.5/10
PCGamesN	8/10
Pocket Gamer	4/5
TouchArcade	4.5/5

According to Metacritic, which uses a weighted average, Duck Detective: The Secret Salami received an average score of 79/100, indicating "generally favourable reviews". According to OpenCritic, 74% of critics recommended it.

Reception to the gameplay was mixed. Several reviewers praised the "deducktions" for being a simpler and more relaxed experience than other adventure games, while still requiring the player to investigate and think. (Note: Multiple reviews:) Other reviewers criticised the "deducktions" as unintuitive, and that they could leave the player unsure of how to proceed. (Note: Multiple reviews:) Regarding the scene investigation, Nicole Carpenter of Polygon praised it as "rewarding", and Matthew Murphy of Hardcore Gamer wrote that it felt "authentic" as "you're learning about the world around you rather than being randomly placed in it." The inclusion of a final decision was praised by Anyka Pettigrew of Prima Games for giving the player agency, but Matt Sainsbury of Digitally Downloaded criticized it as "gratuitous".

Critical reception to the narrative, especially its comedic elements and charm, was largely positive. (Note: Multiple reviews:) Comparisons were drawn to the detective, noir, (Note: Multiple reviews:) and hardboiled genres, (Note: Multiple reviews:) and several reviewers wrote that it served as a parody of, homage to, or a lighthearted take on tropes common in those genres. (Note: Multiple reviews:) Wright of Mystery Magazine wrote that it felt more like a workplace comedy instead of a detective story, and Sainsbury wrote that "if you were to replace all the whimsical components [of Duck Detective: The Secret Salami] with more typical building blocks, it would work as an example of the [hardboiled] genre, which is exactly how a good satire operates", contrasting it against the parodies of Jason Friedberg and Aaron Seltzer and Adam Sandler: "when the artwork itself becomes a joke, its quality as a parody is greatly diminished". Zoey Handley of Destructoid felt the plot was dull and "extremely limp", and while Murphy praised the plot twists and how every character could be suspected to be the Salami Bandit, he wrote that the pace of the ending was rushed.

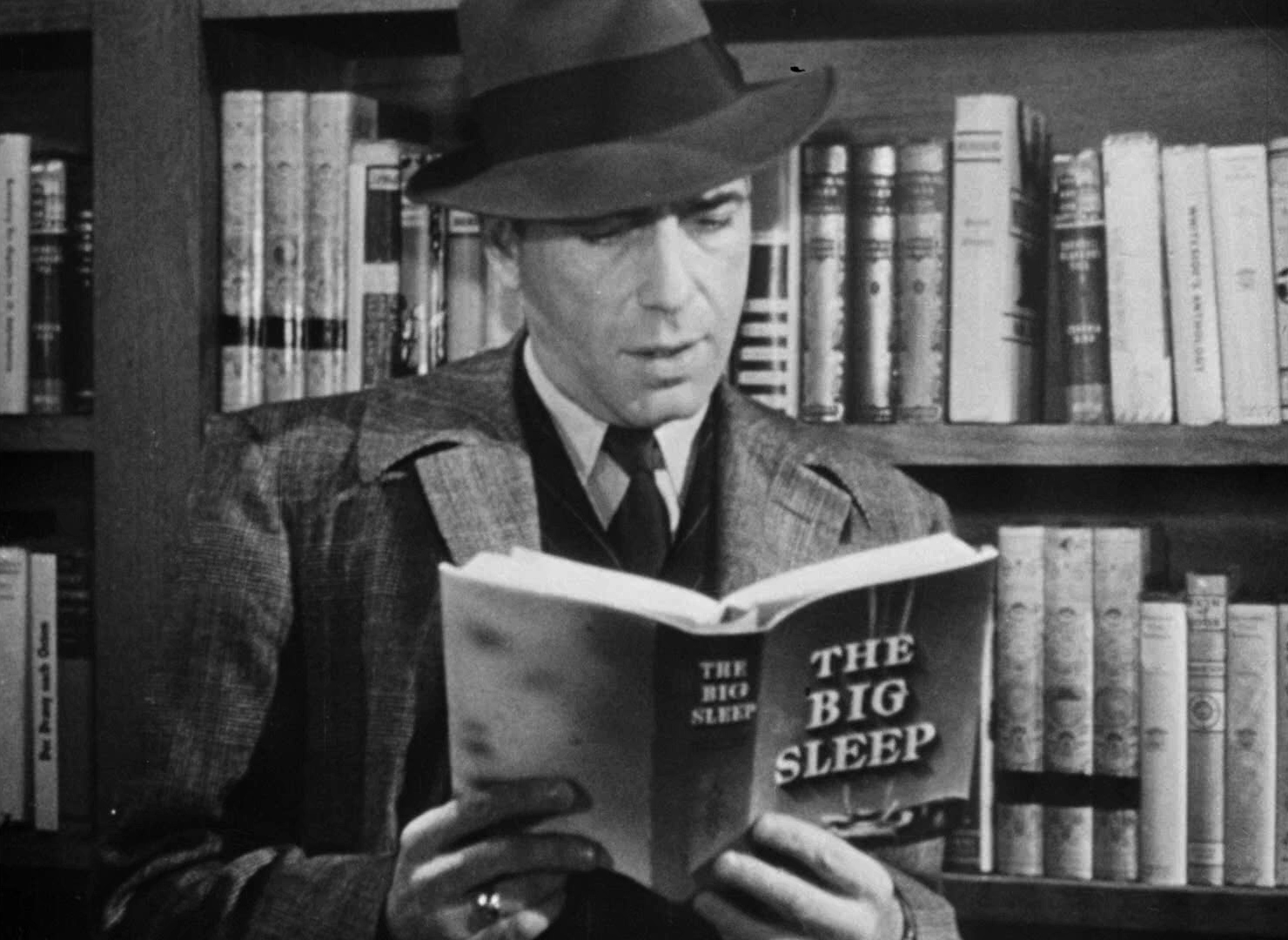
Matt Sainsbury described Duck Detective: The Secret Salami as a satire of the hardboiled genre, comparing Eugene McQuacklin to Philip Marlowe.

The characters were generally praised. (Note: Multiple reviews:) Several reviewers praised the characters for having individual personalities and quirks that sets them apart from the rest. Handley criticized the characters; she wrote that their "motivation[s are] poorly defined to the point where it’s hard to care about anyone." The dialogue and voice acting were generally praised for contributing to the humor, charm, and character depth. (Note: Multiple reviews:) Several reviewers singled out Sean Chiplock's performance of Eugene McQuacklin for praise, writing that the contrast between his deep voice and cartoon appearance worked with the narrative and created humor. (Note: Multiple reviews:) Handley criticized the dialogue for being "sometimes amusing but rarely funny" and "never ever that clever". Cosmin Vasile of Softpedia wrote that "some of the performances can feel a little over-the-top", but still praised the voice acting; he also wrote that he wanted more dialogue.

The art was praised for what reviewers felt was its charm and its blending of two-dimensional paper-like characters and a three-dimensional environment. (Note: Multiple reviews:) Jack Brassell of Pocket Gamer compared the characters to paper dolls, Pettigrew enjoyed the style's similarity to a pop-up book, and several reviewers positively compared it to the Paper Mario series. The characters' animation, such as their "waddling" and breathing animations, were praised for contributing to the comedic atmosphere and plot. The jazz soundtrack was praised for contributing to the noir mood; (Note: Multiple reviews:) Mikhali Madnani of TouchArcade noted the contrast between the soundtrack and the cartoon artstyle, and commended the developers for successfully combining them.

Reception to the short length was polarised. Murphy reviewed it positively, compraing it to a Saturday-morning cartoon, "short and sweet with a unique stylized touch". Multiple reviewers appraised it negatively, writing that they wished they had more time to explore its world. Several reviewers were more equivocal, writing that while the two-to-three hour length was ideal for the game's one case, they also wanted it to be longer. (Note: Multiple reviews:) Reviewers suggested making sequels or having more cases to solve, (Note: Multiple reviews:) and Carpenter wrote that she wanted Duck Detective to become a series of episodic video games. Daniel Bueno of Siliconera summarised the sentiment: "the world in general deserves more Duck Detective".

=== Awards ===
Duck Detective: The Secret Salami was nominated for the 2024 Golden Joystick Awards in the Best Indie Game - Self Published category. It was also nominated for Best Audio Design and Best Mobile Game for the 2025 Deutscher Computerspielpreis. It won in the Best Mobile Game category, which came with a prize of €40,000.

== Sequel ==
Duck Detective: The Ghost of Glamping, a standalone sequel, was announced in December 2024 at Wholesome Snack. It is set in a haunted glamping site, and Freddy Frederson returns from the previous game as a sidekick to Eugene McQuacklin. The gameplay and length are similar to its predecessor. It was released on May 22, 2025 for iOS, Android, Linux, macOS, Windows, Nintendo Switch, Xbox consoles, and the PlayStation 5. It won Best Audio Design for the 2025 Deutscher Entwicklerpreis, and it was nominated for Best Audio Design and Best Mobile Game for the 2026 Deutscher Computerspielpreis.

== Potential animated series ==
Happy Broccoli Games intends to create an animated series based on Duck Detective: The Secret Salami. A pilot based on the beginning of the game was released on May 23, 2026.
