= BuzzFeed Unsolved =

Investigative web series

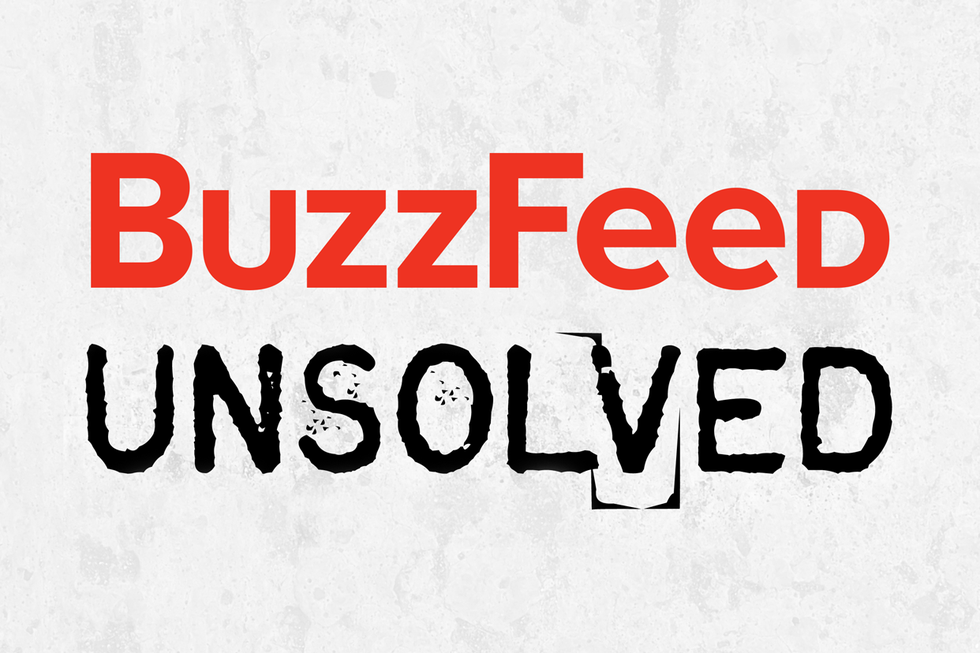
- Also known as: Unsolved
- Genre: Factual television
- Created by: Ryan Bergara
- Written by: Ryan Bergara (until 2021); Blake Wilcox (since 2025)
- Creative director: Steven Lim (until 2021)
- Starring: Ryan Bergara (until 2021); Shane Madej (until 2021); Brent Bennett (2016); Zack Evans (2016–2018); Blake Wilcox; T'Chara
- Narrated by: Ryan Bergara (until 2021); Blake Wilcox (since 2025)
- Theme music composer: Audio Network; Warner Chappell Music; AudioBlocks
- Ending theme: "Anxious" by Duncan Pittock; "Interacted" by Terry Devine-King
- Country of origin: United States
- Original language: English
- No. of seasons: Total: 17; True Crime: 8; Supernatural: 7; Sports Conspiracies: 1; Desert Lore: 1
- No. of episodes: Total: 131; True Crime: 66; Supernatural: 55; Sports Conspiracies: 5; Desert Lore: 5

Production
- Executive producers: Katie LeBlanc; Ryan Bergara
- Producer: Shane Madej
- Editors: Anthony Frederick; Steven Castro; Mike Reilly; Grant Henderson; Devlin McClusky
- Running time: 4–55 minutes
- Production companies: BuzzFeed; BuzzFeed Multiplayer

Original release
- Network: YouTube; BuzzFeed
- Release: February 4, 2016 – November 19, 2021 (True Crime and Supernatural)
- Release: September 26, 2025 – present

BuzzFeed Unsolved (also known as simply Unsolved) is a documentary entertainment web series created by Ryan Bergara for BuzzFeed, premiering on February 4, 2016. It first appeared on the YouTube channel BuzzFeed Blue and was later given its own flagship channel BuzzFeed Unsolved Network.

The show was split into two alternating themes, with each season seeing Ryan Bergara and co-host Shane Madej discussing either unsolved crimes in BuzzFeed Unsolved True Crime or investigating alleged haunted locations and demonic possessions in BuzzFeed Unsolved Supernatural. The show was filmed primarily in the United States with some episodes filmed in separate locations in England and Mexico. Most episodes were followed by a question and answer episode, entitled BuzzFeed Unsolved Postmortem, where Bergara and Madej answered questions sent in by viewers about the week's episode.

The series began streaming on Hulu and Amazon Prime in 2018. Prior to the premiere of season 8, BuzzFeed renewed the show for a 9th season, which appeared in late 2018. In 2019, the 10th season premiered in March and the 11th season premiered in September. In late 2019, Bergara and Madej started their own digital production company, Watcher Entertainment, with Worth It's Steven Lim; however, the two continued BuzzFeed Unsolved with a 12th season in March 2020.

BuzzFeed Unsolved True Crime concluded with its 8th and final season in July 2021, and the 7th and final season of BuzzFeed Unsolved Supernatural started in October 2021 and wrapped in November. There are a total of fifteen seasons. Due to the COVID-19 pandemic, Supernatural was not produced in 2020, resulting in one fewer season than True Crime, as production was unable to secure haunted locations to visit under quarantine. The final episode was followed by a behind-the-scenes documentary BuzzFeed Unsolved: The Making of the Final Investigation on 24 November 2021.

The "spiritual successor" to BuzzFeed Unsolved Supernatural is Ghost Files, a documentary entertainment web series by Watcher Entertainment that was first released on September 23, 2022. The successor to BuzzFeed Unsolved True Crime is Mystery Files, which was released on May 19, 2023.

Bergara and Madej returned to the BuzzFeed Unsolved Network through a collaboration with Watcher for a one-off episode on December 7, 2024, reviewing paranormal evidence.

On September 26, 2025, a new show titled Buzzfeed Unsolved Desert Lore was launched. The show featured new hosts Blake and T'Chara.

== Format ==
=== Synopsis ===
BuzzFeed Unsolved True Crime and Supernatural were originally co-hosted by Bergara and Brent Bennett until Madej took over from Bennett in July 2016. Madej does not believe in supernatural phenomena, whereas Bergara does.

=== Production ===
The episodes were normally filmed with the two hosts at a desk, with Bergara presenting either a True Crime or Supernatural case (depending on the season) to Madej and the audience, aided with the use of stock photos and other visuals. In some episodes, the hosts and other crew members traveled around to investigate a location(s), although this method was primarily used for the Supernatural episodes; the show's True Crime seasons were typically filmed all within the Unsolved set. Often, Bergara and a team of producers would pitch and research episodes and Madej would be kept out of the process to give a more fresh perspective.

=== BuzzFeed Unsolved True Crime ===
In the show's True Crime seasons, Bergara focuses on unsolved crimes and mysteries. Bergara reads out the story of the case before presenting a handful of possible suspects and theories. Bergara and Madej will discuss these cases with a comedic tone.

=== BuzzFeed Unsolved Supernatural ===
In the show's Supernatural seasons, Madej and Bergara travel to places with haunted folklore in order to attempt to find evidence of paranormal phenomena. These episodes sometimes contain more frightening scenes than the True Crime episodes, and they broadly involve some sort of in-person investigation.

Throughout their investigations of hauntings, both Madej and Bergara use a variety of instruments and equipment to attempt to collect evidence, including video and audio devices. Other BuzzFeed Unsolved: Supernatural episodes investigate supernatural entities and phenomena such as Goatman and the existence of aliens. The two aim to create an "everyman approach" in discussing the topics, with the use of humor in an effort to balance the tone between dark and goofy.

=== Guests ===
Father Gary Thomas, a pastor who has been to the Vatican to learn about exorcisms and spirits, was featured in several episodes. In "BuzzFeed Unsolved: Supernatural" Season 6, Madej and Bergara investigated an alleged haunting at the home of YouTuber Loey Lane.

== Episodes ==
=== BuzzFeed Unsolved – True Crime ===
#	Episode	Date Published	Postmortem Q+A Episode
Season 1
1	The Mysterious Death of the Somerton Man (Note: The original title of this video was "The Creepiest Unsolved Murder of All Time")	February 4, 2016	—N/a
2	The Horrifying Unsolved Slaughter at Hinterkaifeck Farm	February 20, 2016	—N/a
3	The Bizarre Death of Elisa Lam	March 18, 2016	—N/a
4	The Chilling Mystery of the Black Dahlia	April 1, 2016	—N/a
5	The Strange Deaths of the 9 Hikers of Dyatlov Pass	April 15, 2016	—N/a
6	The Mysterious Death of Tupac Shakur - Part 1	May 20, 2016	—N/a
7	The Mysterious Death of Biggie Smalls - Part 2	May 27, 2016	—N/a
8	The Horrifying Murders of the Zodiac Killer	June 24, 2016	—N/a
9	The Mysterious Disappearance of the Sodder Children	December 23, 2016	—N/a
10	The Odd Death of Michelle Von Emster	January 27, 2017	—N/a
11	The Shocking Case of O. J. Simpson	March 4, 2017	—N/a
12	The Strange Disappearance of D. B. Cooper	March 10, 2017	—N/a
Season 2
1	The Terrifying Axeman of New Orleans	July 28, 2017	August 2, 2017
2	The Mysterious Death of the Boy in the Box	August 4, 2017	August 9, 2017
3	The Bizarre Road Trip of a Missing Family	August 11, 2017	August 16, 2017
4	The Tragic Murder of JonBenét Ramsey	August 18, 2017	August 23, 2017
5	The Odd Vanishing of Amelia Earhart	August 25, 2017	August 30, 2017
6	The Creepy Murder in Room 1046	September 1, 2017	September 7, 2017
7	The Strange Drowning of Natalie Wood	September 8, 2017	September 13, 2017
8	The Mysterious Poisoned Pill Murders	September 15, 2017	September 21, 2017
9	The Disturbing Murders at Keddie Cabin	September 22, 2017	September 28, 2017
10	The Suspicious Assassination of JFK	September 29, 2017	October 4, 2017
Season 3
1	The Grisly Murders of Jack the Ripper	January 26, 2018	January 31, 2018
2	The Thrilling Gardner Museum Heist	February 2, 2018	February 7, 2018
3	The Ghastly Cleveland Torso Murders	February 9, 2018	February 15, 2018
4	The Enigmatic Death of the Isdal Woman	February 16, 2018	February 22, 2018
5	The Strange Killing of Ken Rex McElroy	February 23, 2018	February 28, 2018
6	The Scandalous Murder of William Desmond Taylor	March 2, 2018	March 7, 2018
7	The Historic Disappearance of Louis Le Prince	March 9, 2018	March 14, 2018
8	The Disturbing Mystery of the Jamison Family	March 16, 2018	March 21, 2018
Season 4
1	The Sinister Disappearance of Jimmy Hoffa	July 13, 2018	July 18, 2018
2	The Bizarre Collar Bomb Bank Robbery	July 20, 2018	July 25, 2018
3	The Mysterious Death of the Eight Day Bride	July 27, 2018	August 1, 2018
4	The Incredible Alcatraz Prison Break	August 3, 2018	August 8, 2018
5	The Covert Poisoning of an Ex-Russian Spy	August 10, 2018	August 15, 2018
6	The Odd Death of Charles C. Morgan	August 17, 2018	August 22, 2018
7	The Bizarre Disappearance of Bobby Dunbar	August 24, 2018	August 29, 2018
8	The Treacherous Treasure Hunt of Forrest Fenn	September 7, 2018	September 12, 2018
9	The Chilling Black Dahlia Murder Revisited	January 11, 2019	—N/a
Season 5
1	The Eerie Case of the Watcher	March 22, 2019	April 2, 2019
2	The Unusual Australian Shark Arm Murders	March 29, 2019	April 3, 2019
3	The Suspicious Case of the Reykjavik Confessions	April 5, 2019	April 10, 2019
4	The Unexplained Murder of Bugsy Siegel	April 12, 2019	April 17, 2019
5	The Horrifying Texarkana Phantom Killer	April 19, 2019	April 24, 2019
6	The Shocking Florida Machete Murder	April 26, 2019	May 1, 2019
7	The Puzzling Disappearance of Walter Collins	May 3, 2019	May 8, 2019
8	The Curious Death of Vincent Van Gogh	May 10, 2019	May 15, 2019
9	The Impossible Disappearance of Dorothy Arnold	September 26, 2019	—N/a
Season 6
1	The Macabre Death of Edgar Allan Poe	March 13, 2020	March 18, 2020
2	The Missing Identity of the Lady of the Dunes	March 20, 2020	March 25, 2020
3	The Tinseltown Murder of Thelma Todd	March 27, 2020	April 1, 2020
4	The Creepy Quandary of Who Put Bella in the Wych Elm	April 3, 2020	April 8, 2020
5	The Puzzling Case of Marilyn and Sam Sheppard	April 10, 2020	April 15, 2020
6	The Mysterious Death of The Somerton Man Revisited	April 17, 2020	April 22, 2020
Season 7
1	The Eerie Vanishing of The Flannan Isles Lighthouse Keepers	October 16, 2020	October 21, 2020
2	The Daring Heists of The Elusive Pink Panthers	October 23, 2020	October 28, 2020
3	The Suspicious Death of Harry Houdini	October 30, 2020	November 4, 2020
4	The Sudden Disappearance Of Cynthia Anderson	November 6, 2020	November 11, 2020
5	The Maritime Mystery of The Mary Celeste	November 13, 2020	November 18, 2020
6	The Haunting Murder Case of the Hammersmith Ghost	November 20, 2020	November 25, 2020
Season 8
1	The Mysterious Death of George Reeves	June 18, 2021	June 23, 2021
2	The Puzzling Disappearance of Agatha Christie	June 25, 2021	June 30, 2021
3	The Menacing Case of the Monster with 21 Faces	July 2, 2021	July 7, 2021
4	The Perplexing Disappearance of Judge Joseph F. Crater	July 9, 2021	July 14, 2021
5	The Tragic Death of Princess Diana	July 16, 2021	July 21, 2021
6	The Bizarre Death of Alfred Loewenstein	July 23, 2021	July 28, 2021

=== BuzzFeed Unsolved – Supernatural ===
#	Episode	Published	Postmortem Q+A Episode
Season 1
1	The Creepy Real-Life "Men In Black"	April 29, 2016	—N/a
2	The Secret Society of the Illuminati	July 29, 2016	—N/a
3	3 Horrifying Cases of Ghosts and Demons	October 26, 2016	—N/a
4	The Chilling Exorcism of Anneliese Michel	November 12, 2016	—N/a
5	The Bizarre Toxic Death of Gloria Ramirez	December 3, 2016	—N/a
6	The Spirits of the Whaley House	January 13, 2017	—N/a
7	The Haunted Decks of the Queen Mary	February 17, 2017	—N/a
Season 2
1	The Ghosts And Demons of Bobby Mackey's	April 7, 2017	—N/a
2	The Harrowing Hunt for Bigfoot	April 14, 2017	—N/a
3	3 Real-Life Creepy Cases of Ancient Aliens	April 21, 2017	—N/a
4	The Haunted Halls of Waverly Hills Hospital	April 28, 2017	May 10, 2017
5	The Strangest Disappearances in the Bermuda Triangle	May 5, 2017	May 10, 2017
6	The Murders That Haunt the Lizzie Borden House	May 12, 2017	May 17, 2017
7	The Spontaneous Human Combustion of Mary Reeser	May 19, 2017	May 24, 2017
8	The Haunting of the Salem Witch Trials	May 26, 2017	May 31, 2017
9	The Haunted Quarters of the Dauphine Orleans Hotel	June 2, 2017	June 7, 2017
10	The Bizarre Voodoo World of New Orleans	June 9, 2017	June 14, 2017
Season 3
1	The Ghost Town at Vulture Mine	October 13, 2017	October 18, 2017
2	Three Bizarre Cases of Alien Abductions	October 20, 2017	October 25, 2017
3	The Captive Spirits of Eastern State Penitentiary	October 27, 2017	November 1, 2017
4	The Demonic Goatman's Bridge	November 3, 2017	November 8, 2017
5	The Horrors of Pennhurst Asylum	November 10, 2017	November 15, 2017
6	Roswell's Bizarre UFO Crash	November 17, 2017	November 22, 2017
7	The Mysterious Disappearance of the Roanoke Colony	November 24, 2017	November 29, 2017
8	London's Haunted Viaduct Tavern	December 1, 2017	December 6, 2017
9	The Chilling Chambers of Colchester Castle	December 8, 2017	December 13, 2017
10	The Subterranean Terrors of the London Tombs	December 15, 2017	December 20, 2017
Season 4
1	The Search for the Mysterious Mothman	April 20, 2018	April 25, 2018
2	The Shadowy Spirits of Rolling Hills Asylum	April 27, 2018	May 2, 2018
3	The Demonic Bellaire House	May 4, 2018	May 9, 2018
4	The Phantom Prisoners of Ohio State Penitentiary	May 11, 2018	May 16, 2018
5	The Unexplained Phoenix Lights Phenomenon	May 18, 2018	May 23, 2018
6	The Spirits of Moon River Brewing	May 25, 2018	May 30, 2018
7	The Horrifying Sorrel-Weed Haunted Mansion	June 1, 2018	June 6, 2018
8	The Mystical Villa Montezuma Mansion	June 8, 2018	June 13, 2018
Season 5
1	Return to the Horrifying Winchester Mansion	October 19, 2018	October 24, 2018
2	The Demon Priest of Mission Solano	October 26, 2018	October 31, 2018
3	The Terrors of Yuma Territorial Prison	November 2, 2018	November 8, 2018
4	3 Videos from the Pentagon's Secret UFO Program	November 9, 2018	November 14, 2018
5	The Haunted Town of Tombstone	November 16, 2018	November 21, 2018
6	The Haunting of Hannah Williams	November 23, 2018	November 29, 2018
7	The Hunt for La Llorona - The Weeping Woman	April 4, 2019	—N/a
8	The Demonic Curse of Annabelle the Doll	June 28, 2019	—N/a
Season 6
1	The Hidden Secrets of Area 51	September 20, 2019	September 25, 2019
2	The Haunting Shadows of the St. Augustine Lighthouse	September 27, 2019	October 2, 2019
3	The Lost Souls of the USS Yorktown	October 4, 2019	October 9, 2019
4	The Hollywood Ghosts of the Legendary Viper Room	October 11, 2019	October 16, 2019
5	The Haunting of Loey Lane	October 18, 2019	October 23, 2019
6	The Unbelievable Horrors of the Old City Jail	October 25, 2019	October 30, 2019
Season 7
1	The Demonic Possession of the Conjuring House	October 15, 2021	October 20, 2021
2	The Horrors of Villisca Ax Murder House	October 22, 2021	October 27, 2021
3	The Gettysburg Ghosts of Farnsworth House Inn	October 29, 2021	November 3, 2021
4	The Haunted Halls of Morris–Jumel Mansion	November 5, 2021	November 10, 2021
5	The Spirits of Pythian Castle	November 12, 2021	November 17, 2021
6	Return To The Demonic Sallie House	November 19, 2021	—N/a

=== BuzzFeed Unsolved - Sports Conspiracies ===
#	Episode	Published
Season 1
1	The Mysterious Retirement of Michael Jordan	December 14, 2017
2	Patrick Ewing and the Frozen Envelope	December 21, 2017
3	The Strange Case of Deflategate	December 28, 2017
4	Muhammad Ali and the Phantom Punch	January 4, 2018
5	The Notorious Game 6 of Lakers vs. Kings	January 11, 2018

=== Buzzfeed Unsolved - Desert Lore ===
#	Episode	Published
Season 1
1	The Most Haunted American Hotel In The Desert	September 26, 2025
2	The Unexplained Bodies Along Route 66	October 3, 2025
3	Investigating The Most Dangerous Waterpark in The Desert	October 10, 2025
4	The Deadly Secrets of Lake Mead (The Lake of Death)	October 17, 2025
5	Our Night At The Most Terrifying Clown Motel In The Desert	October 24, 2025

== Ending segments ==
The "Hot Daga" – a portmanteau of "hot dog" and "saga" – is a recurring segment at the end of some Postmortem episodes that focuses on a cast of anthropomorphized food.
