= Sallie House =

19th century house in Atchison, Kansas

General information
- Location: 508 N 2nd St, Atchison, KS 66002, Atchison, Kansas, United States
- Coordinates: 39°33′59.7″N 95°6′53.0″W

Website
- https://visitatchison.com/highlight/sallie-house

The Sallie House is a haunted house and tourist attraction located in Atchison, Kansas. The house dates back to the mid-1800s, and is said to be haunted by the ghost of a young girl named Sallie, though Sallie is also thought to be a facade for something more demonic. The house has been vacant since the 1990s.

== History ==
The Sallie House was built in the mid-1800s, commissioned by the Finney family and home to Dr. Charles Finney. Some believe Dr. Finney practiced medicine from the house, using the bottom floor for surgery and examination, and a bedroom as an office. The Finney family lived upstairs until moving out due to a lack of space. However, the layout and floor plan of the house does not suggest this theory.

The house was listed on the real estate website Zillow for $1 million in February 2016, dropped to $499,000 in August, and taken off market in November 2017.

== Haunting ==
The Sallie House is reported to be haunted by the ghost of a young girl who died there. According to legend, a child named Sallie was brought to Dr. Finney's house by her mother for severe abdominal pain. He gave her anesthesia and began emergency surgery, as he believed that Sallie's appendix was about to rupture; however, he made the first incision before the anesthesia kicked in. As he continued surgery, Sallie was screaming from pain and bled out, which ended up killing her. However, there is no physical evidence of a Sallie living or dying on the property and it has been said that the mayor made the story up as a publicity stunt to attract more visitors to the city of Atchison, Kansas.

Multiple former tenants have alleged paranormal activity there. It has been especially reported by male residents and visitors, some of whom have claimed to have been scratched until they bled, which has led to Sallie being dubbed "The Man Hating Ghost". This could be because the last thing Sallie saw before death was the male doctor, who she believed was torturing her.

In the 1990s, the house was featured on the paranormal investigations television show Sightings. Former residents appeared on the show A Haunting in 2006 and on Paranormal Witness in 2013. On January 17, 2015, it appeared on an episode of the Travel Channel series Ghost Adventures. It has been featured twice on the show Buzzfeed Unsolved: Supernatural; first in Season 1 Episode 3 in 2016, and again in the final episode of the show, Season 7 Episode 6, in 2021.
