= Shane Madej =

American Internet personality (born 1986)

- Born: Shane Alexander Madej; May 16, 1986 (age 40); Schaumburg, Illinois, U.S.
- Education: Columbia College Chicago
- Occupations: Internet personality paranormal investigator
- Years active: 2014–present
- Known for: BuzzFeed Unsolved; Puppet History; Mystery Files
- Spouse: Sara Rubin (m. 2023)

Shane Alexander Madej ((IPA: /ˈmə.dɛj/; born May 16, 1986) is an American Internet personality, paranormal investigator, and co-founder of digital entertainment company, Watcher Entertainment. Madej rose to prominence for co-starring in the YouTube true crime and supernatural series BuzzFeed Unsolved.

== Early life ==
Madej was born on May 16, 1986, in Schaumburg, Illinois to Mark and Sherry Madej. He has one brother, Scott.

He went to Northern Illinois University for two years before attending Columbia College Chicago for editing. Following his graduation, Madej worked several jobs including producing corporate videos, working in public-access television and at Starbucks.

== Career ==
=== BuzzFeed (2014–2019) ===
Madej joined BuzzFeed as an intern before later joining the unscripted team. In December 2016, Madej took over as the co-host in BuzzFeed Unsolved with Ryan Bergara. He made his first appearance in the episode "The Secret Society Of The Illuminati". The show was split into two separate series, Unsolved: True Crime and Unsolved: Supernatural. The former featured Bergara presenting unsolved true crime cases to Madej and presenting possible theories, while Supernatural consisted of the pair investigating reportedly haunted locations and attempting to elicit responses for paranormal proof. The show became one of Buzzfeed's most successful series, generating over a billion video views and 16.6 billion minutes of total watch time.

Madej was also the creator and host of the successful educational BuzzFeed show, Ruining History. This show focused on Madej telling unbelievable stories of history to a panel of other BuzzFeed employees – with Bergara and Sara Rubin being consistent panelists.

Madej left BuzzFeed as a full-time employee in 2019. In 2020, he and Bergara signed a contract to finish the final seasons of Unsolved, which ended in 2021.

=== Watcher Entertainment (2019–present) ===
In 2019, Madej co-founded a digital production company, Watcher Entertainment, with fellow ex-Buzzfeed employees, Bergara and Steven Lim. The trio served as co-CEOs until 2023, when both Madej and Bergara stepped down to focus on the creation of content.

The channel hosts are a variety of shows starring Madej, Bergara, and Lim, spanning cooking, mystery, gaming, and horror. Included is Unsolved's successors – Mystery Files and Ghost Files – which have both proved successful.

Madej is the creator of the web series, Puppet History, a spiritual successor to his Buzzfeed show Ruining History. The series consists of Madej starring as The Professor, a puppet, quizzing Bergara and a special guest on peculiar historical events and people. Madej also portrays a large variety of different characters on the show, including at least one new puppet every episode, an evil genie, and a fictionalized version of himself. The show received an Honoree Award at the 2022 Webby Awards for a Science & Education Channel and remains one of Watcher's most popular shows.

In 2023, Madej and Bergara went on a national tour to premiere the second season of Ghost Files. In April 2025, Madej appeared as himself on the ABC show The Rookie. He and Bergara portrayed themselves in the midst of a paranormal investigation for an episode of Ghost Files.

== Personal life ==
In September 2023, Madej married his longtime girlfriend, Sara Rubin.

== Filmography ==
=== Film ===
Year	Title	Role	Notes
2020	Beautiful Day	Male Hiker	Short Film

=== Television ===
Year	Title	Role	Notes
2020	S.W.A.T.	Ira	Episode: "Gunpowder Treason"
2025	The Rookie	Himself	Episode: "A Deadly Secret"
