= Steven Lim =

American internet personality

- Born: November 10, 1990 (age 35); Ohio, USA
- Education: Ohio State University
- Occupation: CEO of Watcher Entertainment
- Years active: 2016–present
- Notable work: Worth It
- Spouse: Tammy Cho
- Children: 1

Steven Lim (born November 10, 1990) is an American Internet personality and co-founder of the digital entertainment company, Watcher Entertainment. Lim first rose to prominence after creating and starring in the BuzzFeed food series, Worth It.

== Early life ==
Lim graduated from Ohio State University in 2012 with a chemical engineering degree. Later, he worked as a researcher and a development engineer for the company Procter & Gamble, working on Tide Laundry Pods.

== Career ==
=== YouTube and Buzzfeed (2013–2019) ===
Lim started his YouTube channel in 2013. Wanting more Asian representation in media, he quit his job and began making weekly videos, exploring various Asian-American cultural issues. In 2014, Lim's videos "Asian Parents React to I Love You" and "Things Bilingual People Do" went viral, catching the eye of internet media company, BuzzFeed.

Buzzfeed reached out to Lim and offered him a job. He served as an Executive Producer, often producing videos on Asian culture or food. Lim eventually came up with the premise of Worth It, a food series where he and his co-hosts would visit three different restaurants of varying prices to taste a particular dish and determine which one version was most "worth it" for the given price. The series was co-hosted by Lim and Andrew Ilnyckyj, with cameraman Adam Bianchi appearing in every episode as well. Worth It became one of Buzzfeed's top viewed series, with NBC Sports commissioning an original episode of Worth It to air before the 2018 Super Bowl. The series ran from September 18, 2016, to April 8, 2023.

Worth It won the 2017 and 2018 Streamy Award for best online food show. As of October 2017, the series had been viewed more than 300 million times for a total of over 2 billion minutes; in 2018 alone, viewers watched 1.5 billion minutes on the show. The show's popularity has led to it being described by BuzzFeed as a Zagat guide for millennials, and has created extreme upticks in patronage for some restaurants featured on the show. Lim left the company as full-time employee in 2019, staying on contractually to finish out Worth It.

=== Watcher Entertainment (2020–present) ===
In 2019, Lim co-founded a digital production company, Watcher Entertainment, with fellow ex-Buzzfeed employees, Shane Madej and Ryan Bergara. The trio credited their departure to their desire to found a company with more "creative opportunities" and the ability to have "actual ownership of the content" made. The channel reached over 300,000 subscribers within the first month of launching in January 2020.

Lim, Bergara, and Madej served as co-CEOs until 2023, when both Bergara and Madej stepped down to focus on content creation. The channel features a variety of comedy, paranormal, gaming, cooking, and educational shows – typically hosted by Madej and Bergara. The Watcher main channel had over 500 million views and 3 million subscribers by September 2025. The company launched their own subscription-based streaming service, WatcherTV, in April 2024.

In 2024, Lim launched a spiritual successor to Worth It with Ilnyckyj and Bianchi named Travel Season. It premiered on WatcherTV. In May 2025, the YouTube channel 'Andrew, Steven, and Adam' was launched with Lim, Ilnyckyj and Bianchi, focusing on food reviews and behind the scenes on the food's production. The channel is a subsidiary of Watcher Entertainment and amassed over 100,000 subscribers within the first four days of being announced. Travel Season continues to premiere on WatcherTV, and is later posted onto this channel.

== Personal life ==
Lim is married to Tammy Cho, the CEO of Hate Is A Virus, a non-profit aiming to dismantle hate and racism. The two have openly spoken about their own experiences of racism as Asian Americans, in hopes to raise awareness. Lim is an active advocate for diverse representation and amplifying AAPI voices in media.

"In the end, I realized that representation is not just about talking about your identity and making sure [people] understand who you are," Lim said. “It's not like … you’re pounding it down people’s throats. It’s about being a human being and being present in people’s lives. Me being an Asian American host for a food show that’s [mainly] a food show can have just as much impact as me talking about my identity.”

In March 2025, Cho announced she was pregnant with the couple's first child. Their son was born in June.

== Awards and nominations ==
Year	Award	Category	Nominated work	Result	Ref.
2019	Streamy Awards	Best Cinematography	Worth It (Shared with Andrew Ilnyckyj and Adam Bianchi)	Won	
2023	UNFO Awards	Digital Influencer Award	—N/a	Won	
