= Out for Delivery =

2025 comedy-drama short film

- Directed by: Chelsea Christer
- Written by: Chelsea Christer
- Produced by: Clinton Trucks; Alexa Rocero; David B. Lyons
- Starring: Deanna Rooney; Martin Starr; DeMorge Brown
- Cinematography: Gavin V. Murray
- Edited by: Chelsea Christer
- Music by: Matthew Taylor
- Production company: Session Zero Media
- Release date: January 24, 2025 (Sundance)
- Running time: 16 minutes
- Country: United States
- Language: English

Out for Delivery is a 2025 American short comedy-drama film written and directed by Chelsea Christer.

The film premiered in the U.S. Fiction Short Films category at the Sundance Film Festival on January 24, 2025.

== Synopsis ==
The film follows a woman who, following the worsening of her cancer diagnosis, chooses a dignified death option and arranges for her body to be picked up; however, a delay in the package containing her suicide pill causes logistical problems.

== Cast ==
- Deanna Rooney as Joanna
- Martin Starr as Mark
- DeMorge Brown as Joseph
- John Ross Bowie as Doctor
- Brian David Gilbert as Pharmacy Recording
- Cory Shanbom as ShipEx Delivery Driver
- Dana Swanson as Nurse
- Ele Woods as ShipEx Customer Service #2

== Background ==
Christer and her team planned and arranged the production in the span of nine days.

== Critical reception ==
Film Threat gave the short a 9 out of 10, writing that it "works thanks to a tight control of its tone and perfect casting. Its short runtime ensures the story does not overstay its welcome, and it ends in the only way it truly can."

Horror Buzz gave the short a 7 out of 10, stating that it "has a heck of a cast and creative concept. While the short film contains plenty of jokes and entertains, it’s not without its contemplative, dramatic moments. Though the ending feels definitive, I wouldn’t mind watching a feature-length film."

== Accolades ==
Year	Award	Film Festival	Recipient	Result
2025	Short Film Grand Jury Prize	Sundance Film Festival	Out for Delivery	Nominated
2025	Grand Jury Award - Narrative Short	SXSW Film Festival	Out for Delivery	Nominated
