= The Farnsworth House Inn =

Coordinates: 39°49′32″N 77°13′53″W

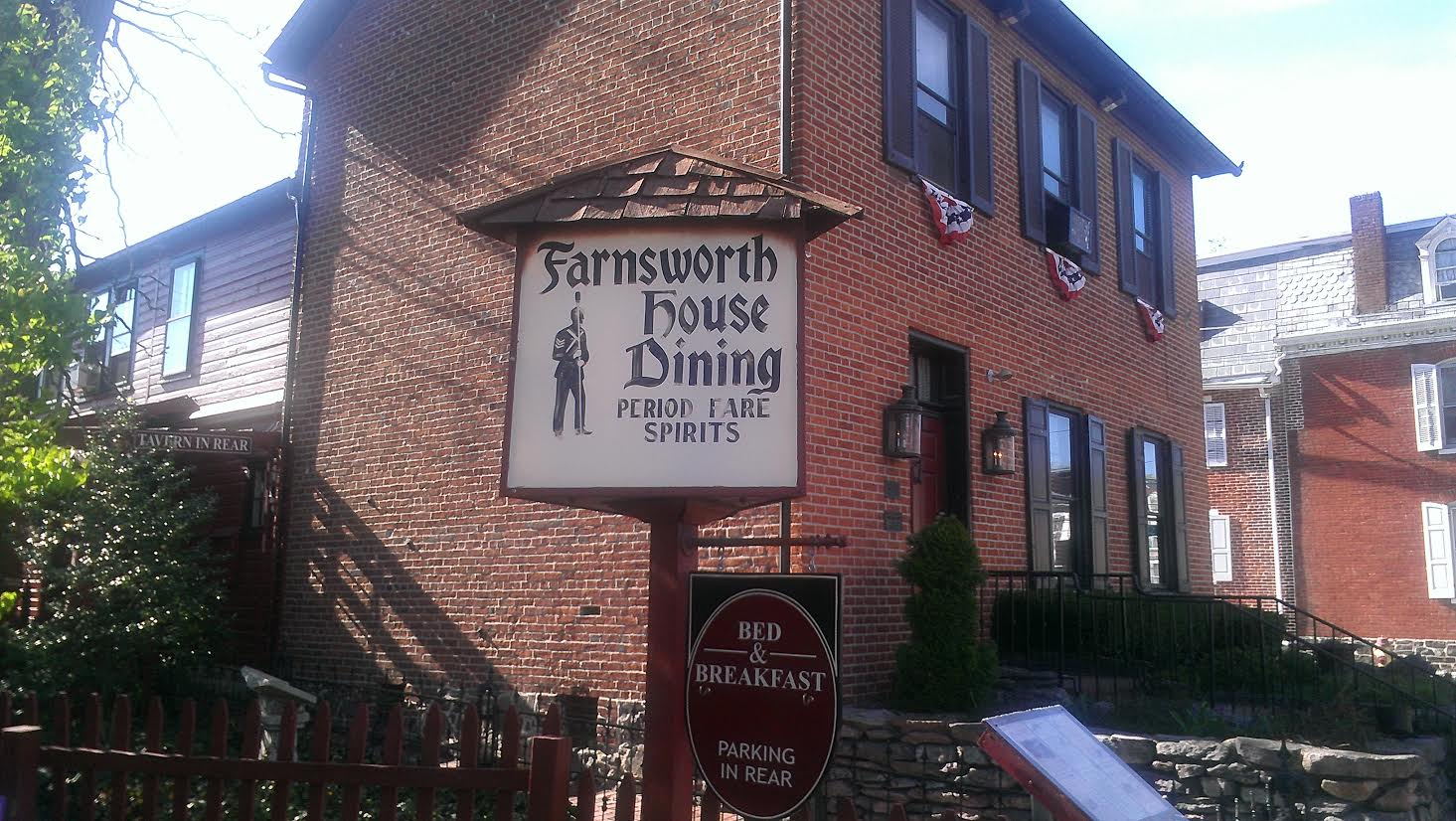
- Signage for The Farnsworth House Inn
- Former names: Sleepy Hollow Inn

General information
- Status: Still standing
- Type: Inn
- Location: 401 Baltimore Street, Gettysburg, Pennsylvania
- Opened: 1810
- Landlord: Loring and Jean Shultz

Website
- www.farnsworthhouseinn.com

The Farnsworth House Inn is a bed and breakfast and tourist attraction located in Gettysburg, Pennsylvania. The building is purported to be haunted, which the business uses in its promotional literature. Apart from being an inn, the building has also served as a tourist home and shop.

== History ==
=== Ownership ===
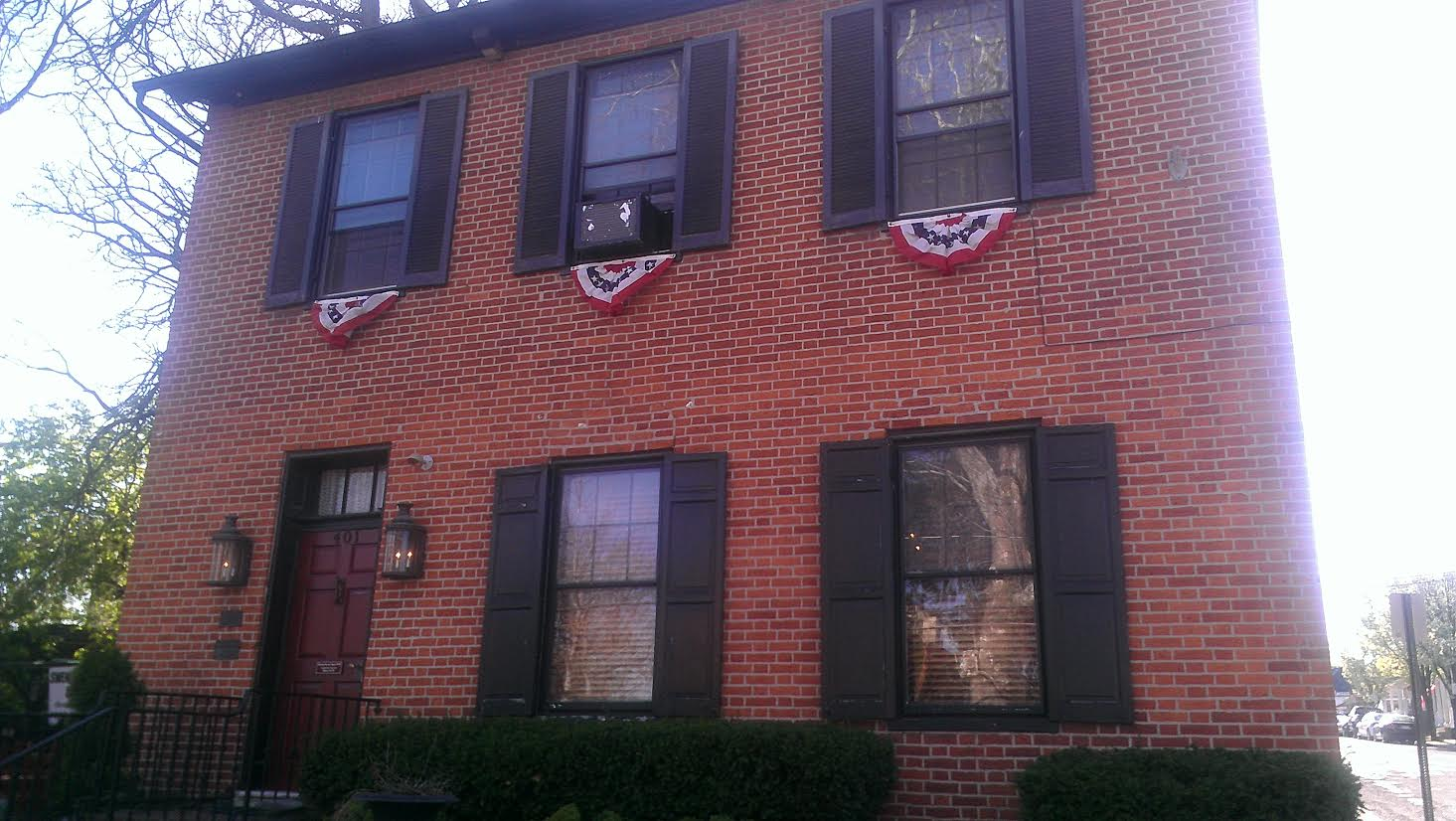
Another view of the inn

The land the inn was built on was previously owned by Reverend Alexander Dobbins, who subdivided a larger estate for the purpose of selling it. John F. McFarlane purchased the land and is stated to be the first recorded owner of the home. Portions of the house are said to be dated to the early 1800s and is claimed to have been built in 1810, but the exact date is unclear. McFarlane owned the home until his death in 1851, at which point it became the property of the Bank of Gettysburg.

From 1918 to 1958, the property was owned by George Black and was known as the Sleepy Hollow Lodge. During the Civil War, the property was owned by Harvy D. Sweney and his family. In 1972, the house was renamed in honor of Brigadier General Elon J. Farnsworth by current owner, Mr. Loring Shultz, and remains a bed & breakfast. The current owners claim that General Lewis Armistead was brought to and treated at the home before dying on July 5, but this is historically debatable as other reports state he was brought to the George Spangler Farm where he died.

=== Historical aspects ===
The Gettysburg Address procession passed in front of the Sweney House. "…But the greatest of the great men that honored this occasion was President Lincoln mounted on a beautiful bay charger…Like Saul of old he towered a head taller than any man. He sat gracefully bowing with a modest smile and uncovered head to the throng of women, men and children that greeted him from the doors and windows. His modest appearance and dignified manners, to say nothing of the noble speeches he made here, has endeared him to the hearts of the people and added thousands of friends to him on that day." Mr. Sweney and the house was, utilized during the Battle of Gettysburg.

== Paranormal ==
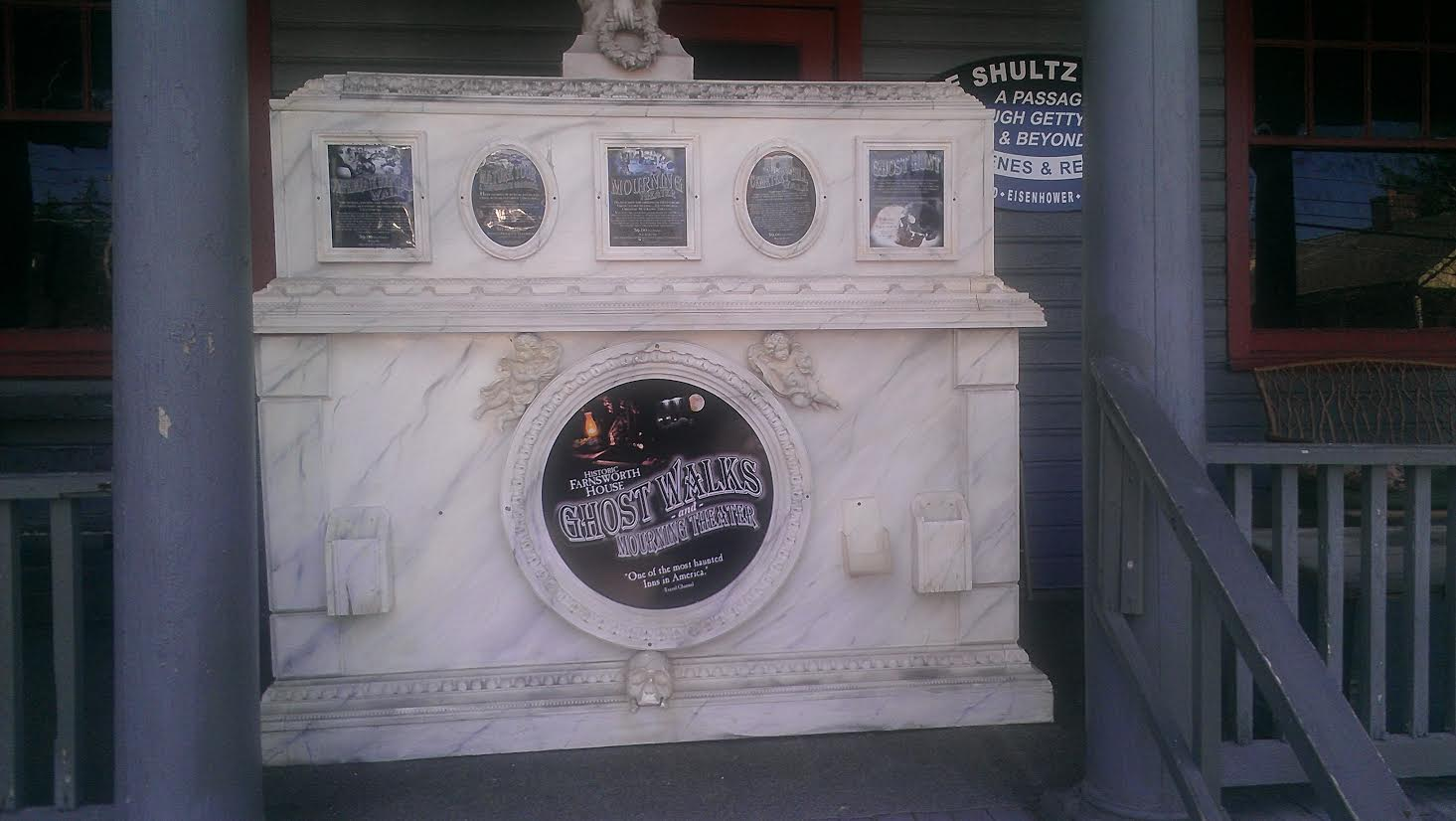
A stone describing tour options at the inn

The Shultz family claims that the inn has been haunted by as many as 16 spirits at one point in time and that each spirit has its own distinct personality and name. The inn has several rooms that are supposed to be "hot spots" for specific spiritual activity for particular ghosts such as the "Sara Black Room", which is supposed to be one of the most active rooms and will have spirits that can be photographed from the street.
