= Worth It (TV series) =

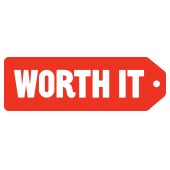
- Genre: Travel, Food
- Created by: Steven Lim
- Starring: Steven Lim; Andrew Ilnyckyj; Adam Bianchi
- Country of origin: United States
- Original language: English
- No. of seasons: 12
- No. of episodes: 84 (excluding special episodes)

Production
- Executive producers: Steven Lim; Andrew Ilnyckyj; Adam Bianchi
- Production company: BuzzFeed

Original release
- Network: YouTube; BuzzFeed
- Release: September 18, 2016 – April 8, 2023

Worth It was an American entertainment web series by BuzzFeed. Starring Steven Lim and Andrew Ilnyckyj, it ran from September 18, 2016 to April 8, 2023. Posted to Hulu and YouTube, each episode of the series compares three different food dishes from three locations that are sold at low, medium, and high price points.

== Background ==
Steven Lim came up with the idea for Worth It when he debated whether it was worth bringing a date to an expensive sushi restaurant or if it would be better to get a takeout California roll. The premise connected with YouTube viewers, and so he created another video and published it a week later. By the fourth episode, the show and premise demonstrated that they had staying power. Lim was also motivated by how the premise allowed him to weave Asian-American themes into his work. According to Lim, Buzzfeed's original plan was to feature two white hosts while Lim wrote the show's scripts.

Worth It was one of several food shows Buzzfeed launched around this time, and Worth It's cast and crew came together as part of those efforts. One of Buzzfeed's goals for Worth It and other shows launched around the same time was to compete for advertising dollars that would traditionally go towards network television shows.

== Premise ==
Each episode sees presenters Steven Lim and Andrew Ilnyckyj, along with cameraman Adam Bianchi, (Note: The first two episodes featured only Lim and Keith Habersberger.) visiting three different restaurants to try similar foods at three "drastically different price points"—affordable, mid, and luxury. The three are invariably positive about the food that they eat, a differentiating factor from BuzzFeed's other video content.

== Impact ==
The series airs on Hulu and YouTube and episodes were frequently featured at the top of those sites' "trending" videos—a factor that allowed the series to garner a global audience.

Worth It won the 2017 and 2018 Streamy Award for best online food show. As of October 2017, the series had been viewed more than 300 million times for a total of over 2 billion minutes; in 2018 alone, viewers watched 1.5 billion minutes on the show. "When we watch the pair appraise a $1 coffee versus a $914 coffee in Tokyo," Candice Chung of Australia's Special Broadcasting Service writes, "we are watching the reaction of 'food civilians' who would marvel as we would at the heart-stopping price difference at a drink so humble and quotidian." The show's popularity has led to it being described by BuzzFeed as a Zagat guide for millennials, and has created extreme upticks in patronage for some restaurants featured on the show.

The success of Worth It influenced Buzzfeed's decision to launch a new reviews section in 2018.

The series ended on April 8, 2023.

== Episodes ==
Season	Episodes	Originally released	
Season	Episodes	First released	Last released
1	9	September 18, 2016	January 8, 2017
2	10	March 12, 2017	May 14, 2017
3	11	August 27, 2017	February 1, 2018
4	12	March 18, 2018	June 3, 2018
5	6	September 9, 2018	October 14, 2018
6	6	July 14, 2019	August 18, 2019
7	6	October 13, 2019	December 22, 2019
8	6	August 16, 2020	September 20, 2020
9	5	November 18, 2017	March 31, 2019
10	4	May 20, 2020	November 15, 2020
11	3	November 27, 2021	December 11, 2021
12	3	December 3, 2022	December 17, 2022
13	3	March 11, 2023	April 8, 2023

== Spin-offs ==
A spin-off series, Worth It: Lifestyle, was first aired in January, 2017 on BuzzFeedBlue, featuring Lim as host and a variety of BuzzFeed employees as co-hosts. The spin-off has the same premise as the original series, except that the hosts try three different experiences and items as opposed to only food.

Two international spin-offs of Worth It have been produced: Worth It UK, hosted by Richard Alan Reid with various alternating hosts and Joseph Bor as the "sound guy" (Bor also co-hosted the fish and chips episode of the series); and a pilot episode for BuzzFeed India, hosted by Akash Iyer and Arshad Wahid with Aishwarya Katkade as the "sound guy." Andrew Ilnyckyj appears in two episodes of the UK spin-off.

After departing Buzzfeed in 2019, Lim co-created Watcher Entertainment alongside two other Buzzfeed alumni. In May 2025, the entertainment company launched a separate YouTube channel titled "Andrew, Steven, and Adam" which is considered an unaffiliated follow-up to the original Worth It series on the Buzzfeed network. The channel once again follows Lim, Ilnyckyj, and Bianchi as they review dishes across different price points through more of a storytelling lens.
