= Watcher Entertainment =

American media company

YouTube information
- Channels: Watcher; Watcher Podcasts
- Years active: 2020–present
- Genres: Paranormal; Comedy; Cooking; Gaming; Education
- Subscribers: 3.05 million
- Views: 539 million
- Last updated: May 9, 2026
- Website: watcherentertainment.com

Watcher Entertainment is an American digital media and entertainment company, founded by Steven Lim, Shane Madej, and Ryan Bergara. The channel features a variety of comedy, paranormal, gaming, cooking, and educational shows – typically hosted by Madej and Bergara. The Watcher main channel has over 400 million views and 3 million subscribers. The company launched their own streaming service, WatcherTV, in 2024.

== History ==
=== Buzzfeed and the creation of Watcher Entertainment (2019) ===
Madej, Bergara, and Lim met while working at the digital media company BuzzFeed. Madej and Bergara were co-hosts of the popular true crime and paranormal series Buzzfeed Unsolved and Lim was the creator and co-host of the popular internet food series Worth It. Both shows generated a combined 2 billion views with 15 billion minutes watched, making them two of the most successful shows on Buzzfeed.

In 2019, Madej, Bergara, and Lim quit Buzzfeed as full-time employees. They each stayed on as contracted employees to complete their respective shows. The trio credited their departure to their desire to found a company with more "creative opportunities" and the ability to have "actual ownership of the content" made.

The company is majority-owned by the trio. They received funding from Neuro, a caffeinated energy gum company; Boba Guys, a bubble-milk tea chain; and Steve Chen, a YouTube co-founder.

Watcher Entertainment gained its name from the infamous true crime case of The Westfield Watcher, which Madej and Bergara had covered in a Buzzfeed Unsolved episode.

The trio began the company as co-CEOs; however, Bergara and Madej stepped down from the role in 2023 to focus on content creation.

=== Watcher Entertainment (2020–present) ===
Watcher Entertainment was launched in January 2020. The company debuted with seven series and a weekly interactive talk show: Homemade, Grocery Run, Weird Wonderful World, Puppet History, Tourist Trapped, Top 5 Beatdown, Spooky Small Talk, and Watcher Weekly. The channel reached over 300,000 subscribers within the first month of launching. They were signed by talent agency CAA in the same year.

Puppet History, a comedy educational game show, quickly became a success and gained a significant audience. The show, which stars Madej as a fluffy blue puppet, has spanned seven seasons and led to the creation of a variety of merchandise. It has featured a variety of guest stars on every episode, including other former Buzzfeed employees.

The company premiered its first horror series in July 2020 with Are You Scared?.

Following the end of Buzzfeed Unsolved: Supernatural in 2021, the studio premiered its highly anticipated successor, Ghost Files, just months after. The show followed a similar format, with Bergara and Madej investigating reportedly haunted locations and attempting to find evidence of the paranormal. The show had significant success, with critics noting the improved production value and design from its predecessor.

In 2023, Bergara and Madej went on a tour across the United States to premiere episodes of the second season. The series was renewed for a third season, which they premiered with a United Kingdom tour in 2024.

That year, Watcher premiered a light-hearted successor to the graphic Buzzfeed Unsolved: True Crime, with Mystery Files. In this rendition, Bergara or Madej present unusual crime or supernatural mysteries with a collection of theoretical solutions. The show was met with great success by audiences and was quickly renewed for a second season.

Watcher launched a second channel, 'WatcherPodcasts,' in October 2023. The channel features podcasts hosted by Lim, Bergara, and Madej.

On April 19, 2024, the company launched its Watcher streaming service. Going forward, all of their content would be released exclusively on the service and the company planned to transition away from YouTube. This announcement was met with overwhelmingly negative reactions from their fans, with many calling for the company to reverse the decision. Additionally, their YouTube channel lost over 50,000 subscribers in the day following the announcement. On April 22, 2024, the company issued an apology and changed their decision, stating that episodes would instead be released on the streaming service a month before their premiere on YouTube.

In May 2025, the channel 'Andrew, Steven, and Adam' was launched as a subsidiary of Watcher with the release of the second season of Travel Season. Travel Season is a spiritual successor to Worth It with the same cast of Lim, Andrew Ilnyckyj, and Adam Bianchi. The channel focuses on food reviews and the behind of the scenes of making it. The main channel is now set to be focused primarily on horror, creepy, and paranormal content.

== Channels and shows ==
=== Watcher ===
==== Current shows ====
- Puppet History (2020–present)
  - A whimsical puppet host walks through history's wildest tales as two guests compete for the title of history wizard.
- Making Watcher (2020–present)
  - What happens when 3 creators with no business experience decide to make their own company? A multi-series documentary on the journey of creating Watcher Entertainment.
- Weird Wonderful World (2020–present)
  - Curious pals Madej and Bergara explore lesser-known destinations and the fascinating subcultures within them.
- Too Many Spirits (2020–present)
  - Bergara and Madej read and rate audience-submitted ghost stories, while getting progressively more tipsy drinking cocktails prepared by Steven and Ricky Wang.
- Top 5 Beatdown (2020–present)
  - Bergara and Madej compare asinine top 5 lists with a topical expert, inspiring surprisingly heated debate.
- Are You Scared? (2020–2022, 2024–present)
  - Bergara reads the internet's scariest stories (some true, some false) to his pal Madej as they try to figure out if the story is experienced or imagined.
- Ghost Files (2021–present)
  - Bergara and Madej investigate haunted locations to discover whether something paranormal really lies within.
- Mystery Files (2023–present)
  - Bergara and Madej present unusual crime or supernatural mysteries with a collection of theoretical solutions.
- Survival Mode (2023–present)
  - Bergara and Madej play a variety of horror games and give a spooky review.

==== Former shows ====
- Grocery Run (2020)
  - Lim interviews a celeb on their typical grocery run, before returning to their home to help prepare their signature dish.
- Homemade (2020)
  - Lim examines popular food by comparing an elevated restaurant experience vs. a home-cooked experience.
- Spooky Small Talk (2020)
  - Bergara interviews celebs in a haunted house, exposing their fears and if they can manage it, a little about themselves too.
- Social Distancing D&D (2020)
  - Socially Distance along with the motley gang of Watchers as they embark on a great quest of Dungeons and Dragons!
- Tourist Trapped (2020)
  - Begara and Madej battle for tour guide supremacy, highlighting the two sides of a city, tourist attractions and hidden gems.
- Watcher Weekly (2020–2021)
  - Lim, Bergara, and Madej chat the week's content and answer questions, with the occasional musical guest!
- Dish Granted (2021–2022)
  - A show where host and amateur home cook Lim attempts to create the most extravagant dishes for his friends.
- Pretty Historic (2022)
  - Selorm and guests explore beauty and fashion trends from history, try them, and decide whether the trends should remain in the past or come to the present.
- Worth a Shot (2022–2023)
  - Take a seat at a Master Mixologist's bar as pro Ricky Wang crafts the unbelievable into a digestible drink for his guests.

=== Watcher Podcast ===
==== Current shows ====
- Get Scared with Shane, Ryan, and Steven (2023–2025)
  - Previously named 'Pod Watcher'
  - Madej, Bergara, and Lim host a weekly podcasts, exploring a variety of topics and answering viewer questions. Guests occasionally appear to replace one host. Matt Real serves as the producer and a fourth voice for the podcast.
- For Your Amusement (2023–present)
  - Bergara explores a variety of topics surrounding theme parks.

=== Andrew, Steven, and Adam ===
Travel Season (2024–present)

- Lim reunites with Worth It costars Andrew Ilnyckyj and Adam Bianchi in a new food review show.

== Awards and nominations ==
Year	Award	Category	Nominated work	Result	Ref.
2022	Webby Awards	Science & Education Honoree	Puppet History	Won	
2023	Webby Awards	People's Voice	Ghost Files	Won	
2024	Webby Awards	People's Voice	Mystery Files	Won	
2025	Webby Awards	Variety and Reality	Ghost Files	Nominated	
