= Brian David Gilbert =

American comedian (born 1994)

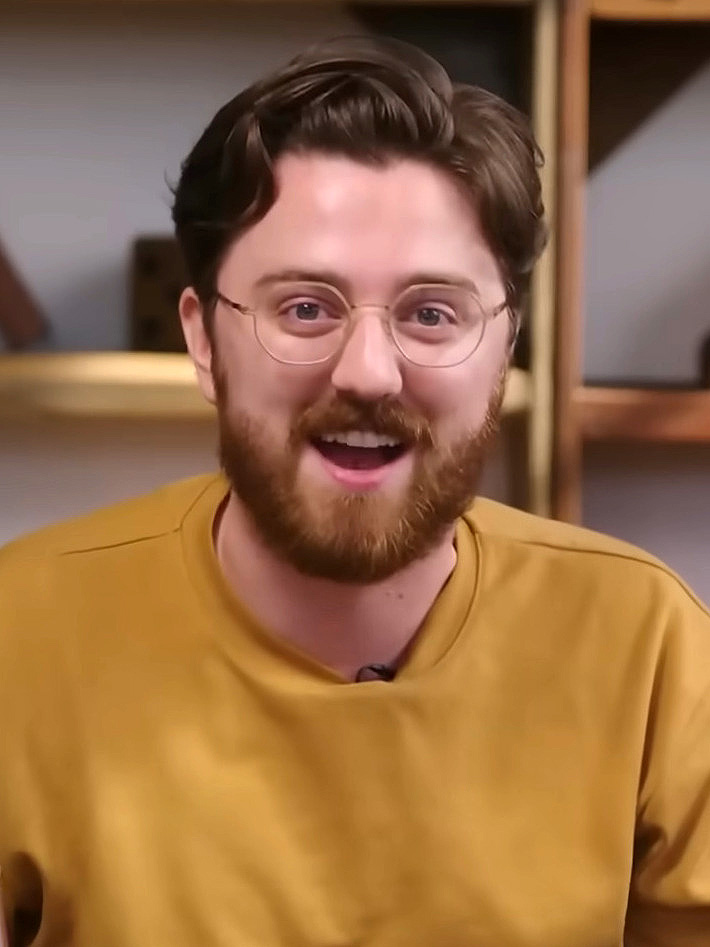
- Gilbert in 2024
- Born: January 29, 1994 (age 32); Baltimore, Maryland, U.S.
- Education: Johns Hopkins University (BA)
- Occupations: Comedian; actor; host; writer; musician; video producer
- Years active: 2012-present
- Partner: Karen Han (engaged 2022)

YouTube information
- Channel: brian david gilbert
- Genres: Comedy; horror; music videos
- Subscribers: 1.1 million
- Views: 140.7 million
- Last updated: September 11, 2025
- Website: www.briandavidgilbert.com

Brian David Gilbert (born January 29, 1994), also known by his initials BDG, is an American comedian, actor, host, writer, musician, and video producer. He worked at Polygon as a video producer from 2017 to 2020, where he hosted the web series Unraveled. Since leaving the publication, Gilbert has written, produced, and starred in horror, comedy, and music videos for his self-titled YouTube channel. He has also appeared in several Dropout productions, most prominently as the fact checker for the game show Um, Actually starting from its ninth season.

== Life and career ==
Gilbert is from Baltimore. He was born on January 29, 1994, and has two older siblings, Patrick and Laura. Gilbert graduated from Johns Hopkins University's School of Arts and Sciences in 2016. The following year, Brian and Laura Gilbert and musician Jonah Scott released the comedy musical YouTube video Stranger Sings, a backing track that syncs up with Stranger Things in place of the show's audio. It depicts the characters as a boy band and replaces the Demogorgon with the "Jazzman".

Brian David Gilbert became a Polygon.com video producer in late 2017. He gained popularity for Unraveled, a series of comedic video game deep dives, such as reviewing the 337 books that appear in Skyrim. At Pax East 2019, he performed a version of the PokéRap from the Pokémon series that he rewrote to include all 812 Pokémon at the time. After developing a fanbase on Polygon, Gilbert began to create his own content full-time. He left the publication in late 2020 to pursue writing and voice acting, and started a Patreon for his own YouTube channel. Gilbert began working with Karen Han when she was a film writer for Polygon. After leaving the publication, Han appeared in, filmed, and co-wrote many sketches on Gilbert's YouTube channel. The two, along with Laura and Scott, hosted the podcast Let's Make a Music. Gilbert was also a founding member of the band The Altogether with Scott and his sister Sierra, releasing their first studio album, Silo, in July 2020. He later left the band in 2021. In October 2020, Gilbert and Han released a YouTube video titled Earn $20K EVERY MONTH by being your own boss, described by The A.V. Club as "one of the year's most unnerving horror movies".

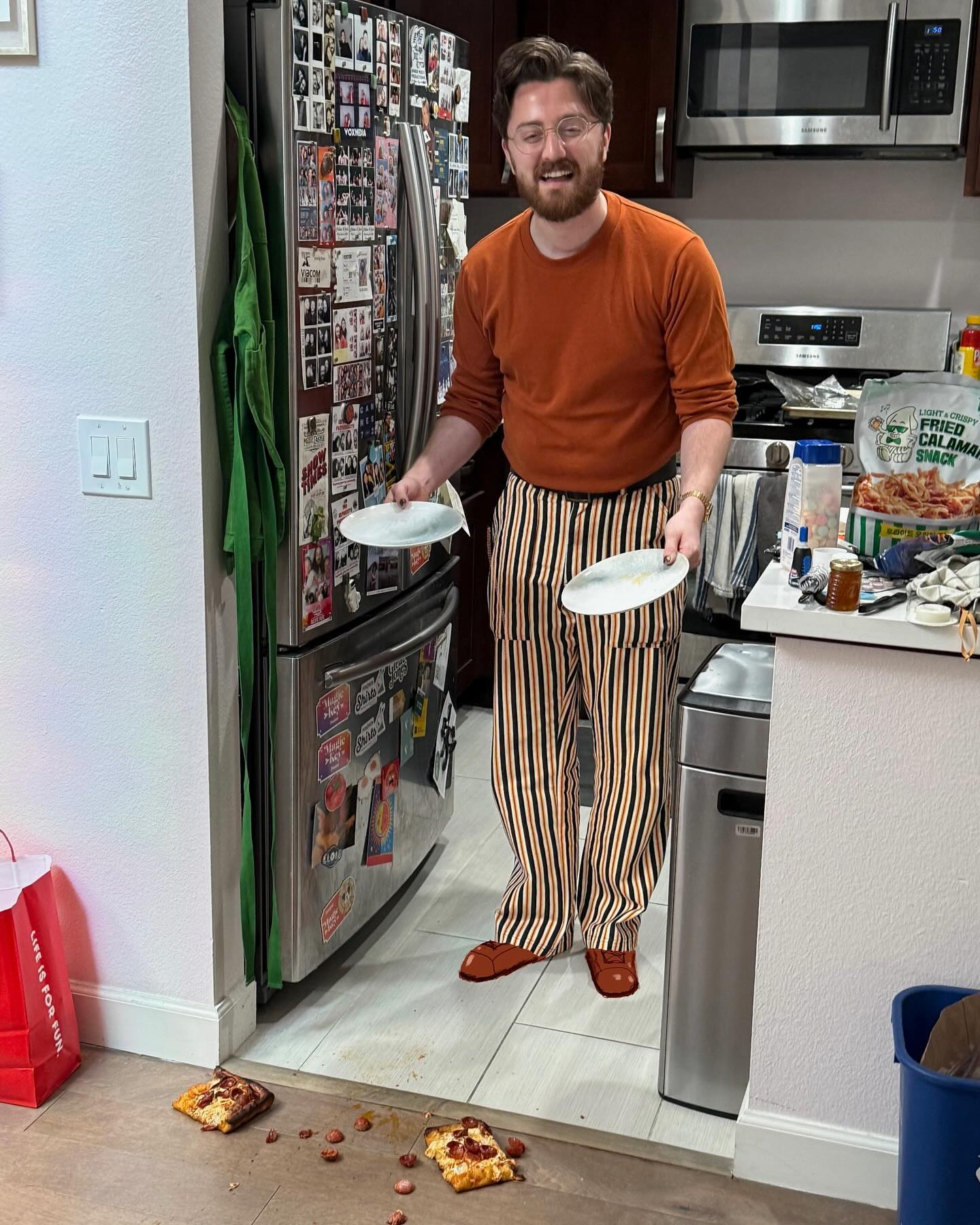
Gilbert poses after his pizzas fall on the floor, 2020s.

For Halloween 2021, Gilbert released a series (co-written by Jonah Scott) of monster-themed ABBA covers under the name AAAH!BBA. The series included a cover of "Lay All Your Love on Me" from the perspective of a vampire, "Gimme! Gimme! Gimme! (A Man After Midnight)" sung as Victor Frankenstein, "Money, Money, Money" as a mummy, "Under Attack" as an evil robot, and "S.O.S." as Captain Hook. After a 2021 video in which he invented ice cream flavors, he collaborated with a Baltimore ice cream shop, The Charmery, on a limited-edition flavor.

In 2022, Gilbert released a 30-minute video explaining the American health insurance system. The video, titled A terrible guide to the terrible terminology of U.S. health insurance, was inspired by his experience losing health benefits from his Polygon job and continuing coverage under the Consolidated Omnibus Budget Reconciliation Act until it expired. A podcast produced by Kaiser Health News called it "the best video about health insurance ever", and The New York Times said it was "silly, but useful", contrasting it with Gilbert's usual "geeky sense of humor".

Gilbert and Han announced their engagement in December 2022. At the time, they were writing a Netflix animated series and an Annapurna Interactive game.

Gilbert appeared in the 2023 animated series Adventure Time: Fionna and Cake as the Winter King, an alternate version of the Ice King. The same year, he voiced a non-playable character in the video game Honkai: Star Rail; his role was uncredited, but fans recognized his voice. In 2024, Gilbert became a cast member of two Dropout series: Um, Actually, on which he replaced Michael Saltzman as the fact checker for the ninth season, and Nobody Asked, a new science-entertainment series. The same year, he and Han worked on a pitch for a children's puppet television series titled Outdoor Ed, releasing a pilot on Gilbert's YouTube channel. Gilbert appeared in the 2024 video game Duck Detective: The Secret Salami and its 2025 sequel Duck Detective: The Ghost of Glamping as Freddy, a crocodile. In 2025, Gilbert was announced as the host of The Gotta Catch 'Em All! Game Show, a web series hosted on the official Pokémon Twitch channel.

== Style ==
Gilbert's YouTube videos include music videos, comedy sketches, and tutorials. His work combines comedy, horror, and music. He told Johns Hopkins Magazine in 2023: "When you boil it down, horror and comedy are essentially the same thing. They both require you to have your expectations reversed at some point. And I've always loved music." According to video game scholar Emma Vossen, Gilbert's videos about video games have involved leftist themes akin to BreadTube, such as a video analyzing whether Mario is able to retire, interlacing comedic elements with discussions of labour, household income, cost of living, and wealth inequality.

== Filmography ==
=== Film ===
Year	Title	Role	Notes	Ref.
2021	The Fall	Leafie, Dad (voice)	Short film	
2025	Out for Delivery	Pharmacy Recording	Short film	
2026	Dog Years	Neil	Post-production	

=== Television ===
Year	Title	Credited as		Role	Notes	Ref.
Year	Title	Actor	Writer	Role	Notes	Ref.
2023	Adventure Time: Fionna and Cake	Yes	No	The Winter King (voice)	Episode: "The Winter King"	
2026	Star Trek: Starfleet Academy	Yes	No	DOT robot	2 episodes	
2026	Among Us	No	Yes		2 episodes	

=== Web series ===
Year	Title	Credited as					Role	Notes	Ref.
Year	Title	Creator	Writer	Editor	Actor	Other	Role	Notes	Ref.
2017	Dances Moving!	Yes	Yes	Yes	Yes	Yes	Instructor	7 episodes; also composer	
2018–2020	Unraveled	Yes	Yes	Yes	Yes	Yes	Himself (host)		
2019	Dimension 20	No	No	No	Yes	No	Hargis	Episode: "Fantasy High Live in Brooklyn"	
2021	Asdfmovie	No	No	No	Yes	No	Miscellaneous (voice)	Episode 13	
2022	Make Some Noise	No	No	No	Yes	No	Himself	Episode: "A Villain and Their Real Estate Agent Tour Volcano Lairs"	
2022	Puppet History	No	No	No	Yes	No	Himself	Episode: "The Defenestrations of Prague"	
2023	Dynamo Dream	No	No	No	Yes	No	General Caput		
2023	Very Important People	No	No	No	Yes	No	Professor Avery Goodman	Episode: "Professor Avery Goodman"	
2024	Game Changer	No	No	No	Yes	No	Podium inspector, himself	2 episodes	
2024	Dropout Presents	No	No	No	Yes	No	Himself	Episode: "Chris Grace: As Scarlett Johansson"	
2024–present	Um, Actually	No	No	No	Yes	Yes	Himself / Fact checker	24 episodes; also creative producer	
2024- present	Deep Space Discounts	No	No	No	Yes	No	Deedee		
2024–2025	Nobody Asked	No	No	No	Yes	No	Himself (host)	5 episodes	
2025	The Gotta Catch 'Em All! Game Show	No	No	No	Yes	No	Himself (host)		

=== Ludography ===
Year	Title	Credited as		Voice role	Notes	Ref.
Year	Title	Actor	Writer	Voice role	Notes	Ref.
2018	Fallout 76	Yes	No	Initiate Pappas, Petersen		
2020	Maneater	Yes	No	Conspiracy Theorist		
2021	Kraken Academy!!	Yes	No	Player character, Mr. Whistler		
2023	Honkai: Star Rail	Yes	No	Silvermane Guard		
2023	Starfield	Yes	No	Phil Hill		
2024	Duck Detective: The Secret Salami	Yes	No	Freddy Frederson		
2025	Duck Detective: The Ghost of Glamping	Yes	No	Freddy Frederson		
2025	Cabernet	Yes	No	Petya		
2026	Starship Troopers: Ultimate Bug War!	No	Yes			
