= Polygon (website) =

Video game website

- Logo used since 2012
- Website type: Entertainment website
- Available in: English
- Predecessor: Joystiq
- Editors: Chris Grant (2012–2019); Christopher Plante (2019–2025)
- Parent: Vox Media (2012–2025); Valnet (2025–present)
- Website: polygon.com
- Commercial: Yes
- Registration: Optional
- Launched: October 24, 2012; 14 years ago
- Current status: Active

Polygon is an American entertainment website which covers video games, movies, television, comics, and other popular culture. It was launched in October 2012 by Vox Media as its third property. In May 2025, Polygon was sold to Valnet.

The website had eight co-founding editors, which included the editors-in-chief of the gaming sites Joystiq, Kotaku and The Escapist. It sought to distinguish itself by focusing on the stories of the people behind video games and long-form magazine-style feature articles.

== History ==
=== Founding (2012) ===
The gaming blog Polygon was launched on October 24, 2012, as Vox Media's third property. The site grew from technology blog The Verge, which was launched a year earlier as an outgrowth of sports blog network SB Nation before Vox Media was formed. Vox Media's chief executive officer, Jim Bankoff, approached Joystiq editor-in-chief Christopher Grant in early 2011 about starting a video game website. (Note: Vox's Bankoff was a former AOL executive and Joystiq was an AOL-owned video game blog.) Bankoff considered video games to be a logical vertical market for Vox, whose sites attracted an 18- to 49-year-old demographic. He also saw games to be an expanding market in consideration of mobile and social network game categories. Forbes described Bankoff's offer as a "serious commitment to online journalism" in an age of content farms and disappearing print publications, but Grant did not trust the offer and declined. Upon seeing the effort that Vox Media put into The Verge, their Chorus content management system, and the quality of their content and sponsorships, Grant changed his mind and returned to pitch Bankoff. Grant wanted the new site to compete with top gaming websites GameSpot and IGN, but still be able to run longform "magazine-style journalism" that could be of historic interest compared to performance driven web journalism. As part of the site's attempt to "redefine games journalism", Vox Media made a 13-part documentary series of the site's creation ("Press Reset") that tracked the site's creation from start to launch.

Forbes described Polygon's original 16-person staff as "star-studded" for including the editors-in-chief from three competing video game blogs. Grant left Joystiq in January 2012 and brought the editors-in-chief of Kotaku and The Escapist, Brian Crecente and Russ Pitts. Other staff included Joystiq managing editor Justin McElroy as well as weekend editor Griffin McElroy, and staff from UGO, IGN, MTV, VideoGamer.com, and 1UP.com. The Polygon team includes remote workers based in Philadelphia, Huntington, San Francisco, Sydney, London, and Austin, while Vox Media is headquartered in New York City and Washington, D.C. The site was developed over the course of ten months, where the staff chose the site's name and set standards for their reporting and review score scale. Polygon staff published on The Verge as "Vox Games" beginning in February 2012 and ending with their October launch. The site's name was announced at a PAX East panel in April. It refers to a polygon—"the basic visual building block of video games".

=== Continued operations (2013–2025) ===
After raising money in a second round of funding in late 2013, Vox Media announced that they would be investing further in the site's video product, such that the site's experience would feel "as much like TV programming as magazine publishing". Polygon announced that it would run fewer features in June 2014, with the departure of features editor Russ Pitts, their video director, and video designer. Polygon hired Susana Polo, founder of The Mary Sue, in 2015, which marked a transition in the site's scope to add pop culture and entertainment alongside their video game coverage. GamesIndustry added that the hire marked a changing cultural sensibility in game and tech media towards the acceptance of progressive, feminist principles in the wake of Gamergate.

Vox Media later created several sites dedicated to specific video games with editorial staff from Polygon and SB Nation: The Rift Herald (for League of Legends) in March 2016, and The Flying Courier (for Dota 2) and Heroes Never Die (for Overwatch) in June 2017. Brian Crecente left Polygon for Rolling Stone's gaming website Glixel in July 2017, and Chris Plante replaced him as Executive Editor. Polygon video producer Nick Robinson left Polygon in August 2017, following allegations of inappropriate online sexual advances. Video producers Brian David Gilbert and Jenna Stoeber were hired soon after. In 2018, Griffin and Justin McElroy announced their departure from Polygon, in order to focus on their podcasting and families. In July 2019, Editor-in-Chief (EIC) Christoper Grant was elevated to the position of Senior Vice President of Polygon and The Verge by Vox Media. Grant was replaced as EIC by Plante. On December 28, 2020, Brian David Gilbert announced he was leaving Polygon via Twitter and his final Unraveled video, saying he left "because it feels like the right time!".

=== Valnet (2025–present) ===
In May 2025, Vox Media sold Polygon to Valnet, while also laying off most of their staff. This layoff included EIC Plante. Aftermath reported they were informed by a "former employee" that "at least 25 people have been let go" and noted many of the laid off staff "were union members". The Vox Media Union was negotiating a new contract with Vox Media at the time, and the Writers Guild of America East (who represents the union) condemned the sale as union busting. Chris Grant shared his frustrations on Bluesky, stating that Valnet had refused to meet with him or answer questions during the process.

In an interview, Valnet's Rony Arzoumanian said that the deal to purchase Polygon had been in the works for a few months, and that they retained about ten staff and expect to add more to build its team to build out the site more for the next five to ten years. Arzoumanian also said they had no plans to eliminate the archive of Polygon articles, nor to incorporate artificial intelligence in their product.

== Content ==
We want to focus on the human side of development, and focus things on people. I want people to feel the respect that we feel for them.

— Justin McElroy on Polygon's editorial strategy, October 2012

Polygon publishes video game news, entertainment, reviews, and video. They sought to set their content apart from other games journalism outlets by focusing on the people making and playing the games rather than the games alone. At the site's outset, Polygon planned to run multiple longform feature articles weekly, which they intended to be comparable in intent to the cover stories of magazines. They also decided to allow their game review scores to be updated as the games were updated, so as to more adequately reflect games that had changed with downloadable content and updates since their original release. In consideration of games that may differ in quality before and after release, Polygon later began to mark pre-release reviews as "provisional" to defer final scoring until after their public release.

Polygon's emphasis on video production expanded in late 2013, and waned in mid-2014 with the loss of video staff and the editorial decision to run fewer feature articles. By 2015, the site began to shift from games-only coverage to pop culture coverage, similar to the scope of rival sites IGN and Kotaku. In May 2018, Polygon launched the YouTube series "Brand Slam", in which brand mascots battle against one another.

Polygon ran several podcasts over the years, hosted from the main website. Minimap was named among iTunes's best of 2015, and New York praised the site's Car Boys web series. The website's flagship podcast, called The Polygon Show, launched in 2017 and discusses gaming and culture. It was named one of the "10 gaming podcasts every gaming nerd should know" by The Daily Dot in 2018. The site also hosted general video game podcast The Besties for a time, when hosts Griffin and Justin McElroy, Chris Plante and Russ Frushtick were employees of Polygon.

Starting in September 2018, the site opted to drop scored reviews for games, as to let their reviewers have more freedom in how they review a game; they will substitute their scoring system for a "Polygon Recommends", a game that the reviewer, having played enough of the game to make a determination, can stand behind and support for the site. These Recommended titles subsequently will serve as the basis of selection of "Polygon Essentials", games that the site feels everyone should play.

=== Design ===
Homepage of Polygon in 2024

The site uses a pink color palette and emulates the magazine-style layout of The Verge. Their longform journalism was optimized for reading on tablets. In August 2024, Polygon migrated their site to the WordPress CMS.

=== Business ===
The site uses a "direct content sponsorship" model of online advertising used by SB Nation and The Verge. For example, a video series sponsorship pairs brands with specific editorial content. Forbes wrote that Vox Media's avoidance of content farm and news aggregator tactics, and interest shown in building communities is desirable to "magazine-quality advertisers". The site pitched its longform journalism to advertisers as an indicator of high-quality content. The site's founding sponsors included Geico, Sony, and Unilever.

In June 2014, Polygon ranked fourth among games sites by Comscore web traffic data, behind IGN, GameSpot, and Kotaku. The same month, Grant reported that the previous month had been their most popular.

== Criticism ==
VentureBeat criticized the site for accepting $750,000 in sponsorship from Microsoft to make documentary Press Reset in 2014. Game Revolution criticized the site's comparatively low review score given to The Last of Us in 2013, which was later increased with the game's remastered edition. Polygon released a gameplay video of Doom in May 2016, which was ridiculed online for being played by someone who appeared to be a first-person shooter novice. The game's creative director Hugo Martin expressed in a 2020 GameLab panel that they found the video valuable.
