= Ryan Bergara =

American Internet personality (born 1990)

- Born: Ryan Steven Bergara; November 26, 1990 (age 35); Arcadia, California, U.S.
- Education: Chapman University (BFA)
- Occupations: Internet personality; actor; paranormal investigator
- Years active: 2016–present
- Notable work: BuzzFeed Unsolved; Watcher Entertainment
- Spouse: Marielle Scott (m. 2022)

Ryan Steven Bergara (born November 26, 1990) is an American Internet personality, actor, paranormal investigator, and co-founder of digital entertainment company, Watcher Entertainment. Bergara first rose to prominence after creating and co-starring in the YouTube true crime and supernatural series BuzzFeed Unsolved.

== Early life ==
Bergara was born in Arcadia, California on November 26, 1990, to Dr. Steven R. Bergara and Linda Bergara. His father works as a dentist and holds a Doctor of Dental Surgery degree. He attended Arcadia High School, where he took advanced film production classes.

Bergara attended Chapman University and earned a Bachelor of Fine Arts in Television and Broadcast journalism in 2013.

== Career ==
=== Buzzfeed (2014–2019) ===
Bergara began working at BuzzFeed in 2014. In 2016 he created the web series Buzzfeed Unsolved while working for the titled company. The show was split into two separate series, Unsolved: True Crime and Unsolved: Supernatural. The former featured Bergara presenting unsolved true crime cases to co-host Shane Madej and presenting possible theories, while Supernatural consisted of the pair investigating reportedly haunted locations and attempting to elicit responses for paranormal proof. The show became one of Buzzfeed's most successful series, generating over a billion video views and 16.6 billion minutes of total watch time. The show ran for eight seasons and included a companion Q&A show, with Bergara serving as an executive producer.

Bergara left Buzzfeed as a full-time employee in 2019. Both Bergara and Madej maintained a contract with the company to finish out the final seasons of Buzzfeed Unsolved, which ended in 2021.

=== Watcher (2019–present) ===
In 2019, Bergara co-founded a digital production company, Watcher Entertainment, with fellow ex-Buzzfeed employees, Madej and Steven Lim. Bergara, Madej, and Lim served as co-CEOs until 2023, when both Bergara and Madej stepped down to focus on the creation of content.

Following the end of Unsolved, Bergara created two successors – Mystery Files and Ghost Files. The former presenting solved and unsolved cases and the latter consisting of Madej and Bergara doing paranormal investigations. The series showed success upon release, leading to new season renewals.

The channel hosts a variety of shows starring Bergara, Madej, Lim, and others, spanning cooking, gaming, horror, and mystery shows.

In 2023, Bergara and Madej went on a national tour to premiere the second season of Ghost Files.

=== Other works ===
Bergara has also made appearances in various film and television roles. In 2020, he had a guest role on the CBS police procedural drama S.W.A.T with Madej. The pair portrayed conspiracy theorists convinced they had spotted aliens, a nod to their online personas.

He has made an appearance alongside Nick Jonas in the 2023 Robert Schwartzman film The Good Half. He has also had cameos in Disney Marvel's Ant-Man and the Wasp: Quantumania and Hulu's miniseries Pam & Tommy.

In February 2025, it was announced that Bergara would be starring alongside co-star Kevin Kreider in Jennifer Zhang's sci-fi thriller Trüebadour. This marks his feature lead acting debut. The story follows the implosion of a tech start up after an innovative AI "storytelling" device is introduced into the company. Jamie Lee Curtis will serve as an executive producer. The movie began filming in April. Bergara and Madej also made a guest appearance on the ABC drama series The Rookie the same month.

Bergara also co-hosts a podcast called For Your Amusement with Byron Marin where they discuss popular attractions at major theme parks.

== Personal life ==
Bergara began dating actress Marielle Scott in September 2018 and the two became engaged in April 2021. He and Scott married in Santa Barbara on July 30, 2022.

He is a believer in the supernatural, and like-minded fans of his are monikered "Boogaras."

== Filmography ==
=== Film ===
Year	Title	Role	Notes
2019	The Pyramid	Martin	Short film
2019	Board Game Night	Carson	Short film
2020	Beautiful Day	Julian	Short film
2020	Were You Gay in High School?	Jessica's Boyfriend	Short film
2020	Holiday Hand Grenade	Carson	Short film
2023	Blackwater	Alex Lee	Short film
2023	Ant-Man and the Wasp: Quantumania	Toasting Man	
2023	The Good Half	Andy	
TBA	Trüebadour	Mike	In post-production

=== Television ===
Year	Title	Role	Notes
2020	S.W.A.T	Eric	Episode: "Gunpowder Treason"
2022	Pam & Tommy	Shit-Talker	Episode: "Destroyer of Worlds"
2025	The Rookie	Himself	Episode: "A Deadly Secret"
