= Digital entertainment =

Digital entertainment Industry includes, but is not restricted to, any combination of the following industries (that themselves have a considerable degree of overlap):

- digital media
- new media
- video on demand
- video games
- interactive entertainment
- online gambling
- mobile entertainment
- social media
- streaming services

"Digital entertainment", largely a hard to define marketing term, rests upon entertainment technology and ultimately on the enabling basic technologies computers, Internet/World Wide Web, digital rights management, multimedia and streaming media. Apart from pure entertainment, the term rests upon the observation that already in 2011 in the UK, for example, "nearly half of people’s waking hours are spent using media content and communications services" ("screen time").

Digital entertainment is inextricably connected with digital marketing. People who follow influencers on social media for entertainment will receive a fair share of advertising at the same time. Digital merchandise is distributed with every computer game and popup ads or similar are ubiquitous in the online (gaming) world.

== See also ==
- Digital Entertainment Content Ecosystem
- Entertainment Software Association
- Digital media use and mental health
