= Amy Bruni =

American paranormal investigator & writer (born 1976)

- Born: July 10, 1976 (age 49); Sacramento, California, U.S.
- Occupation: Paranormal investigator
- Years active: 2007–present
- Known for: Ghost Hunters; Kindred Spirits
- Children: 1
- Website: amybruni.com

Amy Bruni (born July 10, 1976) is an American paranormal investigator and writer known for her appearances on the series Ghost Hunters and Kindred Spirits.

== Early life ==
Bruni was born in Sacramento, California, and grew up in a home in Alameda that she and her family believed was haunted. Bruni says she had her first paranormal experience in the home at age six. "We had multiple experiences with spirits," Bruni recalled. "One time we had neighbors over for dinner and they were saying they didn’t believe in ghosts, and right then a picture came off the wall, hovered there for a second and crashed to the floor. They never set foot in the house again." Her experiences in her childhood home inspired her to seek a career studying the supernatural.

== Career ==
Prior to pursuing a career as a paranormal investigator, Bruni worked as a project manager for a health insurance company in California. "I led a very normal life... It was a normal job, with benefits and everything." In her free time, Bruni started a podcast in 2007 detailing her interest and experiences with the supernatural, which caught the attention of Ghost Hunters investigators Jason Hawes and Grant Wilson. The two contacted Bruni via Myspace and asked her to accompany them on an investigation in California, after which she joined the series as a team member. Her work on Ghost Hunters led her to relocate to the show's base in Rhode Island, where she settled in Portsmouth. Bruni worked on the series for over one hundred episodes. In 2014, Bruni left Ghost Hunters after completing the series' seventh season in order to spend more time with her daughter, who was then a toddler.

Beginning in 2016, Bruni has worked as a paranormal investigator with Adam Berry on the Travel Channel series Kindred Spirits. As of 2023, the series, which also features occasional appearances from psychic Chip Coffey, had completed seven seasons.

In 2020, she published the book Life with the Afterlife: 13 Truths I Learned about Ghosts, which was a USA Today bestseller.

== Personal life ==
While filming an episode of Ghost Hunters in Rhode Island, Bruni met her partner, Jimmy. In 2012, she gave birth to their daughter, Charlotte. As of 2024, Bruni resided on Rhode Island's Aquidneck Island.

== Credits ==
- Ghost Hunters (2007–2011)
- Kindred Spirits (2016–present)
