= The Woman in the Window =

The Woman in the Window may refer to:

== Film ==
- The Woman in the Window (1944 film), a film directed by Fritz Lang
- The Woman in the Window (2021 film), a Joe Wright-directed adaptation of the Finn novel

== Literature ==
- Woman in the Window (1984), a novel by Thomas Gifford under the pen name Dana Clarins
- The Woman in the Window (2009), a short story collection by Emyr Humphreys
- The Woman in the Window: Commerce, Consensual Fantasy, and the Quest for Masculine Virtue in the Russian Novel (2014), a non-fiction work by Russell Scott Valentino
- The Woman in the Window (novel), a 2018 thriller novel by A. J. Finn

== Television ==
- "Woman in the Window", Paranormal State season 1, episode 4 (2008)
- "The Woman in the Window", Why Women Kill season 2, episode 2 (2021)
