= Kindred Spirits (TV series) =

American paranormal/documentary series

- Genre: Paranormal; Reality television
- Starring: Amy Bruni; Adam Berry; Chip Coffey
- Country of origin: United States
- Original language: English
- No. of seasons: 7
- No. of episodes: 71

Production
- Executive producers: Amy Bruni; Adam Berry; Alan LaGarde; Sumit David
- Running time: 45 minutes
- Production companies: Paper Route Productions, Inc

Original release
- Network: Destination America (2016–18); TLC (2016–17); Travel Channel (2019–present); Discovery+ (2021)
- Release: October 21, 2016 – March 24, 2023

Related
- Ghost Hunters; Ghost Hunters Academy

Kindred Spirits is an American paranormal television and documentary reality series. The series premiered on October 21, 2016, on Destination America and TLC, airing there until 2018. It has aired on Travel Channel since the beginning of the third season in 2019. The program stars investigators Adam Berry and Amy Bruni, formerly from the Ghost Hunters and Ghost Hunters Academy television series, which aired on Syfy at the time of Berry and Bruni's departure. Berry and Bruni investigate residences to determine if recurring paranormal activity is tied to the families living there. For the fourth season, psychic medium Chip Coffey joined the cast.

On December 15, 2022, a seventh season was announced, which premiered on January 20, 2023.

== Cast members ==
Character	Role	Kindred Spirits Season							Historically Haunted		This Haunted Life	
Character	Role	S1 2016	S2 2017–2018	S3 2019	S4 2020	S5 2021	S6 2022	S7 2023	2025	2026	2025	2026
Amy Bruni	Paranormal Investigator	Main	Main	Main	Main	Main	Main	Main	Main	Main	—N/a	—N/a
Adam Berry	Paranormal Investigator	Main	Main	Main	Main	Main	Main	Main	—N/a	—N/a	Main	Main
Chip Coffey	Medium	Recurring	Recurring	Recurring	Main	Main	Recurring	Recurring	—N/a	—N/a	—N/a	—N/a

== Episodes ==
=== Series overview ===
Season	Episodes	Originally released	
Season	Episodes	First released	Last released
1	8	October 21, 2016	December 9, 2016
2	10	September 15, 2017	January 1, 2018
3	10	January 24, 2019	March 28, 2019
4	13	January 3, 2020	March 27, 2020
5	10	January 2, 2021	March 6, 2021
6	10	December 18, 2021	February 19, 2022
7	10	January 20, 2023	March 24, 2023

=== Season 1 (2016) ===
- Note: Season 1 premiered on Destination America, but also aired on TLC.

No. overall	No. in season	Title	Location	Original release date	U.S. viewers (millions)
1	1	"Cabin in the Woods"	Little Meadows, Pennsylvania - private residence	October 21, 2016	0.711
An aggressive ghost scratches a person and breaks objects at a desolate cabin. Amy and Adam head deep into the Pennsylvania woods to uncover answers for the family, and find the spirit stalking them.
2	2	"Shoebox Murder" / "Unsolved Murder (Note: Alternate title given at Travel Channel's episode guide.)"	Wallingford, Connecticut - private residence	October 28, 2016	0.823
A hostile spirit attacks a homeowner and smashes objects. This sinister ghost preys on Amy and Adam’s fear to get them to leave the house. A stunning breakthrough leads the investigation toward an infamous unsolved murder.
3	3	"Lost Amy" / "Psychic Findings (Note: Alternate title given at Travel Channel's episode guide.)"	Pittsburgh, Pennsylvania - private residence	November 4, 2016	0.615
An investigation into a shadow figure takes an emotional turn for Amy when a psychic makes a shocking discovery. And, a growling voice makes the team fear the ghost is more negative than they were led to believe.
4	4	"The Basement"	Chelsea, Massachusetts - private residence	November 11, 2016	0.641
A family won’t set foot in the basement after a brutal murder takes place. Kids are seeing shadow figures, and a "scary man" in the closet. Amy and Adam bring in advanced paranormal gadgets, and find shocking evidence on camera.
5	5	"Breaking and Entering" / "New England Haunting (Note: Alternate title given at Travel Channel's episode guide.)"	Rockland, Massachusetts - private residence	November 18, 2016	0.637
A frightened homeowner calls Amy and Adam to solve what’s haunting her New England home. Her security system captured unexplained voices so terrifying that she had to leave her house. Could the activity be connected to a previous homeowner?
6	6	"Trapped in the Attic"	New Britain, Connecticut - private residence	November 25, 2016	0.577
A shadow man terrorizes a small boy, and his mom is so frightened by the activity she won’t use their living space. The case takes a dark twist when the ghost is not who Amy and Adam expect.
7	7	"Shadows"	Tuftonboro, New Hampshire - private residence	December 2, 2016	0.630
A menacing ghost frightens an 11-year-old and she refuses to sleep alone in her room. Is a disturbed grave of a giant Native American man at the root of the haunting? Amy and Adam uncover the answers, coming face to face with the Shadow Man.
8	8	"Buried Alive"	Pembroke, Massachusetts - private residence	December 9, 2016	0.536
An unknown entity torments a teenager, who is afraid to live in his own home. Amy and Adam investigate a creepy crawlspace in an upstairs bedroom. Could the activity be linked to the tragic death of the grandfather, who was buried alive?

=== Season 2 (2017–18) ===
- Note: Season 2 premiered on TLC, but also aired on Destination America.

No. overall	No. in season	Title	Location	Original release date	U.S. viewers (millions)
9	1	"Uninvited Guests"	Providence, Rhode Island - private residence	October 6, 2017	0.433
A terrified couple calls for help after witnessing a chair levitate in their home. Amy endures a chilling paranormal experience in an upstairs bedroom. A psychic's visit later reveals a horrifying truth that leaves Adam and Amy shocked.
10	2	"Home Sweet Holmes"	Brookfield, Massachusetts - private residence	September 29, 2017	0.494
A full-bodied apparition terrorizes two young girls at night, and Adam and Amy catch it on camera! A heinous murder committed more than 100 years ago might help close this investigation.
11	3	"The Legacy of Lizzie Borden"	Fall River, Massachusetts - Lizzie Borden House	September 15, 2017	0.485
Adam and Amy investigate one of the most infamous places in America -- the Lizzie Borden House. One of the tour guides experiences terrifying paranormal activity and she fears for her life. Adam and Amy soon discover there's a life hanging in the balance.
12	4	"The Strangler"	Somersworth, New Hampshire - private residence	October 13, 2017	0.369
A family is paralyzed by fear after a spirit strangles one of the children. The entity visits the other two at night and speaks to them. Adam and Amy must find out if it's passing along a message or targeting its next victim.
13	5	"The Executioner" / "The Electric Chair (Note: Alternate title given at Travel Channel's episode guide.)"	Corning, New York - private residence	September 22, 2017	0.448
Adam and Amy investigate the home of a former executioner who killed hundreds of criminals. Now something's trying to kill the current homeowner. Is it the late executioner? Or is one of his murderous victims responsible for the attack?
14	6	"The Neighbor"	Foxborough, Massachusetts - private residences	October 20, 2017	0.399
Amy and Adam investigate two properties afflicted by the same entity. A cache of haunted objects is key to solving this case, but the objects belonged to different people, making it difficult to determine the culprit.
15	7	"Shadow of a Doubt"	Hudson, New Hampshire - private residence	October 27, 2017	0.444
No one feels safe on the second floor where a shadowy mass haunts a child's room. The entity scares the child at night and growls at his mother from the closet. Amy and Adam are called in to end the constant turmoil.
16	8	"Fire Starter"	Bristol, Vermont - private residence	October 27, 2017	0.394
Homeowners are certain the paranormal is behind a recent house fire. Their daughter always sensed a dark presence looming, and now she believes it's targeting her family. Thinking she might be psychic, Amy and Adam launch a unique investigation.
17	9	"Native Roots" / "The Stalker (Note: Alternate title given at Travel Channel's episode guide.)"	Lakeland, Florida - private residence	October 20, 2017	0.343
An aggressive spirit torments a woman everywhere she goes and lashes out by poking her and breaking items in the house. Amy and Adam launch a full-scale investigation to determine the culprit.
18	10	"Don't Go Into the Attic" (Note: Alternate title given at Travel Channel's episode guide.)"	New Smyrna Beach, Florida - private residence	January 1, 2018	N/A
A family lives in fear because of airborne box cutters, hair pulling and other unexplained paranormal activity. Adam and Amy discover that one of the spirits haunting the home has a vital message to deliver.

=== Season 3 (2019) ===
No. overall	No. in season	Title	Location	Original release date	U.S. viewers (millions)
19	1	"No Salvation"	Liberty, Missouri - Belvoir Winery and Inn (formerly Odd Fellows Home)	January 24, 2019	0.562
Amy and Adam are called to Liberty, Missouri, to investigate the Odd Fellows Home, a massive compound that once cared for orphans and the elderly. More than 10,000 people died on the property. Now their pain has fostered a malevolent entity.
20	2	"Satanic Panic"	Willington, Connecticut - private residence	January 31, 2019	0.578
Amy and Adam investigate a Connecticut home where lives are at stake. Their client believes an evil entity is responsible for killing her children and is living in her home.
21	3	"A Haunting in Gettysburg"	Gettysburg, Pennsylvania - Farnsworth House	February 7, 2019	0.522
Amy and Adam investigate a haunted mirror in Gettysburg, Pennsylvania, one of the most paranormally active places in America. Abnormal activity turned to unrest when an entity suddenly became physical.
22	4	"Terror in the Woods"	West Boylston, Massachusetts - private residence	February 14, 2019	0.546
Amy and Adam investigate a supernatural attachment that's causing physical harm to a teenage boy. He thinks the entity followed him out of the woods and is now living in his Massachusetts home.
23	5	"The Shadow of Death"	Louisville, Kentucky - Waverly Hills Sanatorium	February 21, 2019	0.445
Amy and Adam visit Waverly Hills Sanatorium in Louisville, Kentucky. Considered the most haunted location in America, the massive building houses countless spirits, but a dangerous entity on the fourth floor is cause for major concern.
24	6	"Blood in the Water"	Marion County, Tennessee - Hales Bar Dam	February 28, 2019	0.497
Amy and Adam head to Tennessee to investigate Hales Bar Dam, a location cursed by a chieftain warlord. Centuries later the curse still wreaks havoc on the land, and the current owner fears an evil entity is out for revenge.
25	7	"Dying Regrets"	King George, Virginia - Belle Grove Plantation	March 7, 2019	0.601
Amy and Adam investigate a Virginia plantation where an evil overseer who died after the Civil War has returned to strike fear into the living by seeking out the dead he once brutalized.
26	8	"Ghost Train"	Cape Cod, Massachusetts - Crocker residence/historical site	March 14, 2019	0.598
Amy and Adam look into one of the oldest homes on Cape Cod, where violent spiritual activity threatens a family and their baby. Amy and Adam unveil a never-before-seen paranormal experiment.
27	9	"The Villisca Axe Murders"	Villisca, Iowa - Josiah B. and Sara Moore House	March 21, 2019	0.560
Amy and Adam investigate an Iowa farmhouse where a family was brutally murdered by an unknown assailant in 1912. They fear the killer's spirit still resides in the home and is trying to continue his death toll in the afterlife.
28	10	"The Search for Lizzie Borden"	Fall River, Massachusetts - Maplecroft Mansion	March 28, 2019	0.573
Amy and Adam are the first paranormal investigators to enter Maplecroft, the mansion where Lizzie Borden died. They hope it is a groundbreaking opportunity to speak with the spirit of the alleged ax murderer.

=== Season 4 (2020) ===
No. overall	No. in season	Title	Location	Original release date	U.S. viewers (millions)
29	1	"School Spirit"	Maxwell, Iowa (actually Farrar, Iowa) - Farrar Schoolhouse	January 3, 2020	0.407
A dark, hulking entity has taken refuge in an abandoned schoolhouse. The owners call in Amy and Adam to combat the debilitating energy that shrouds the building. Chip also helps the investigation.
30	2	"Hell House"	Harrisville, Rhode Island - The Farm on Round Top Road (also known as The Conjuring House)	January 10, 2020	0.431
Amy, Adam, and Chip investigate the infamous Harrisville farmhouse and the Perron family.
31	3	"Silent Fear"	TBA	January 17, 2020	0.522
Amy, Adam, and Chip help a family haunted by a demented shadow creature.
32	4	"Dead Men Tell Tales"	St. Augustine, Florida - Old St. Johns County Jail	January 24, 2020	0.474
Amy and Adam confront the murderous spirits lurking inside the Old Jail in St. Augustine, Fla.; they call on Chip who channels a dark vision from beyond the grave.
33	5	"Vaulted Secrets"	Derby, Connecticut - Twisted Vine Restaurant	January 31, 2020	0.395
Amy and Adam investigate a Connecticut restaurant once used as a makeshift morgue after a flood ravaged the town; Chip is called in to confront a powerful poltergeist haunting the building.
34	6	"Nowhere to Run"	Charleroi, Pennsylvania - private residence	February 7, 2020	0.338
Amy and Adam help a single mother left home alone with two frightened children after terrifying apparitions drive everyone else away; Chip must figure out who's to blame.
35	7	"The Trunk"	Brooksville, Florida - May-Stringer House	February 14, 2020	0.454
Amy and Adam visit a Florida museum where multiple attacks on volunteers have sparked the urgent need for a paranormal investigation; they bring in Chip to find out why the aggressive entity is lashing out.
36	8	"Etched in Evil"	Winchester, Indiana - Randolph County Infirmary	February 21, 2020	N/A
Amy and Adam investigate strange symbols etched on the walls of an Indiana asylum; Chip joins the case to help them find out if the symbols are responsible for an up-tick in paranormal activity on the property.
37	9	"What Lies Beneath"	Ogdensburg, New Jersey - Sterling Hill Mine	February 28, 2020	N/A
Amy, Adam and Chip investigate the Sterling Hill Mines in Ogdensburg, N.J.; decades of deaths have fostered a dark energy that lurks in underground tunnels.
38	10	"Blackout"	Granite Falls, North Carolina - private residence	March 6, 2020	N/A
Answering the call of a couple suffering from paranormal attacks; the wife fears an entity is possessing her husband, causing blackouts and fits of anger.
39	11	"Keeper of the Light"	Newport, Rhode Island - Rose Island	March 13, 2020	N/A
Disaster and utter isolation have allowed spirits to fester on a desolate island off the coast of Newport, R.I., leading to reports of terrifying paranormal activity from employees and guests.
40	12	"The Body Box"	South Pittsburg, Tennessee - South Pittsburg Hospital	March 20, 2020	N/A
An old hospital in South Pittsburg, Tenn., once a beacon of hope, now hoards spirits of the dead, including a dog-like entity called the Creeper.
41	13	"Stage Fright"	Asbury Park, New Jersey - Paramount Theatre	March 27, 2020	N/A
The Paramount Theatre in Asbury Park, N.J.; its bright future is marred by a tragic past.

=== Season 5 (2021) ===
No. overall	No. in season	Title	Location	Original release date	U.S. viewers (millions)
42	1	"Devil in Salem"	Salem, Massachusetts - John Proctor House	January 2, 2021	0.286
The team travels to Salem to investigate the home of John Proctor, one of the men executed during the infamous witch trials.
43	2	"Zombie Boy"	Middleborough, Massachusetts - Peter Oliver House	January 9, 2021 (Discovery+)	N/A
Researching claims of possession and lost time at a historic estate in Middleborough, Mass.; a mind-bending discovery makes the team realize that the paranormal field is more dangerous than anyone anticipated.
44	3	"False Witness"	Portsmouth, Rhode Island - Valley Inn	January 16, 2021 (Discovery+)	N/A
45	4	"Shadowed"	Eagle Bay, New York - Toboggan Inn	January 23, 2021 (Discovery+)	N/A
The new owners of the Toboggan Inn fear an aggressive entity that resides in the building. Amy, Chip and others conduct an experiment that shows shocking results.
46	5	"Fright Train"	Gorham, New Hampshire - The Libby House	January 30, 2021 (Discovery+)	N/A
A seemingly ordinary bed and breakfast in New Hampshire is home to vivid, lifelike and scary apparitions.
47	6	"Dead Stop"	Orrtanna, Pennsylvania - Cashtown Inn	February 6, 2021 (Discovery+)	N/A
A flurry of ghostly activity may mean that more than one dead guest calls the historic Cashtown Inn home.
48	7	"Sea Witch"	Quincy, Massachusetts - USS Salem	February 13, 2021 (Discovery+)	N/A
Amy, Adam and Chip take to the high seas to investigate reports of an aggressive spirit that's haunting a US Navy destroyer.
49	8	"Buried Alone"	Newport, Rhode Island - Fort Adams	February 20, 2021 (Discovery+)	N/A
Amy, Adam and Chip conduct a spiritual sweep of Fort Adams, a massive military structure haunted by dead soldiers and victims of various crimes. One lost and lonely spirit stands apart from all the others.
50	9	"Haunting of Graestone Manor"	Gasport, New York - Graestone Manor	February 27, 2021 (Discovery+)	N/A
Amy, Adam and Chip investigate a dark presence in a Victorian mansion; the team suspects a recently unearthed graveyard may have triggered the ghostly activity.
51	10	"Hidden Passage"	Northborough, Massachusetts - The Peter Whitney Parsonage	March 6, 2021 (Discovery+)	N/A
Amy, Adam and Chip face a residential crisis as they investigate a sudden haunting in Massachusetts. The case takes a bizarre turn when it appears a family member's actions control the aggressive entity.

=== Season 6 (2021–22) ===
No. overall	No. in season	Title	Location	Original release date	U.S. viewers (millions)
52	1	"The Undertaker's Secret"	East Bridgewater, Massachusetts - Mrs. Swift's and Moore Antiques and Collectibles (formerly a Masonic temple)	December 18, 2021	0.451
Amy, Adam and Chip visit an old Masonic temple shrouded in mystery and local lore. Their hair-raising investigation leads to the daunting realization that they might be investigating a cold case murder.
53	2	"Watch Over Me"	Guilderland, New York - private residence	December 25, 2021	0.405
Amy, Adam and Chip visit a home suddenly plagued by paranormal activity. The discovery of an old shoe might have triggered the haunting, but the homeowner can't be sure.
54	3	"The Lurker"	Upper Marlboro, Maryland - Linville Manor	January 1, 2022	0.378
Amy, Adam and Chip investigate an 1850s manor where an eyeless entity looms over sleeping guests.
55	4	"Tripwire"	Newburgh, New York - private residence	January 8, 2022	0.440
Amy, Adam and Chip investigate a tiny house with a huge paranormal problem. The mother and daughter who own the home tell stories of a ghastly traveler with eternal ties and of another, much darker, spirit.
56	5	"Toxic Relations"	Little Rock, Arkansas - Fee House	January 15, 2022	0.439
Amy, Adam and Chip investigate a century-old house stricken by tragedy. The former occupants met a series of unfortunate deaths, and their spirits still linger in the home.
57	6	"Carriage House Creeper"	Marlboro, Vermont - Colonel Williams Inn	January 22, 2022	0.366
The second oldest structure in Vermont is no doubt haunted, but a fresh set of owners are experiencing paranormal problems for the first time in their lives. Aggressive spiritual behavior urges them to call in Amy, Adam and Chip to investigate.
58	7	"Tradition Dies Hard"	Union, New Jersey - Liberty Hall	January 29, 2022	0.419
Amy, Adam and Chip investigate a mansion that was converted into a museum at the request of a dying matriarch. Now, her family's spirits haunt the museum. The team attempts to cross over into the spiritual realm to find answers.
59	8	"Disorderly Conduct"	Angola, New York - private residence	February 5, 2022	0.530
Amy, Adam and Chip investigate escalating paranormal problems at a home undergoing renovations. The entities are fiercely protective of the property and lash out when the team attempts to communicate.
60	9	"Death Alley"	Morrilton, Arkansas - Rialto Community Arts Center	February 12, 2022	0.557
Amy, Adam and Chip investigate a century-old theater haunted by a menacing shadow figure. Employees worry that the uninvited guest may have come from a nearby alley rumored to be the site of many murders.
61	10	"Death Interrupted"	Sheboygan Falls, Wisconsin - Sheboygan County Asylum	February 19, 2022	0.494
The caretaker of a defunct insane asylum calls on Amy, Adam and Chip for help after renovations awaken a ghastly presence that stirs up unrest among the building's resident spirits.

=== Season 7 (2023) ===
No. overall	No. in season	Title	Location	Original release date	U.S. viewers (millions)
62	1	"Broken Spirits"	TBA	January 20, 2023	0.328
63	2	"What Lies Below"	TBA	January 27, 2023	0.346
64	3	"Beware the Occult"	TBA	February 3, 2023	0.404
65	4	"Ghost Ships"	TBA	February 10, 2023	0.347
66	5	"The Angry Ghost"	TBA	February 17, 2023	0.339
67	6	"Ghost Wars"	TBA	February 24, 2023	0.318
68	7	"Living With the Dead"	TBA	March 3, 2023	0.345
69	8	"Shadow in the Night"	TBA	March 10, 2023	N/A
70	9	"The Undertaker's Return"	TBA	March 17, 2023	N/A
71	10	"The Country Club Murders"	TBA	March 24, 2023	N/A

== Production ==
The first season premiered on Destination America and TLC on October 21, 2016, and concluded December 9, 2016. On March 8, 2017, TLC renewed the series for a second season, which premiered on September 15, 2017. The third season premiered on the Travel Channel on January 24, 2019.

On December 5, 2019, it was announced that the fourth season would premiere on January 3, 2020. Medium Chip Coffey was announced to be joining the main cast along with Bruni and Berry for the fourth season. On November 18, 2021, a sixth season was announced, which premiered on December 18, 2021.

== Popular culture ==
=== Guest appearances ===
Berry, Bruni, and Coffey all appeared in Travel Channel's October 4, 2019, live 4 hour special titled Haunted Salem: Live, which teamed them with investigators from other Travel Channel series (such as Jack Osbourne and Katrina Weidman of Portals to Hell) for an extensive paranormal investigation of Salem, Massachusetts, and its ties to the Salem Witch Trials.

== See also ==
- Apparitional experience
- List of ghost films
- List of reportedly haunted locations in the United States
