= Illinois College of Optometry =

Private optometry school in Chicago, Illinois

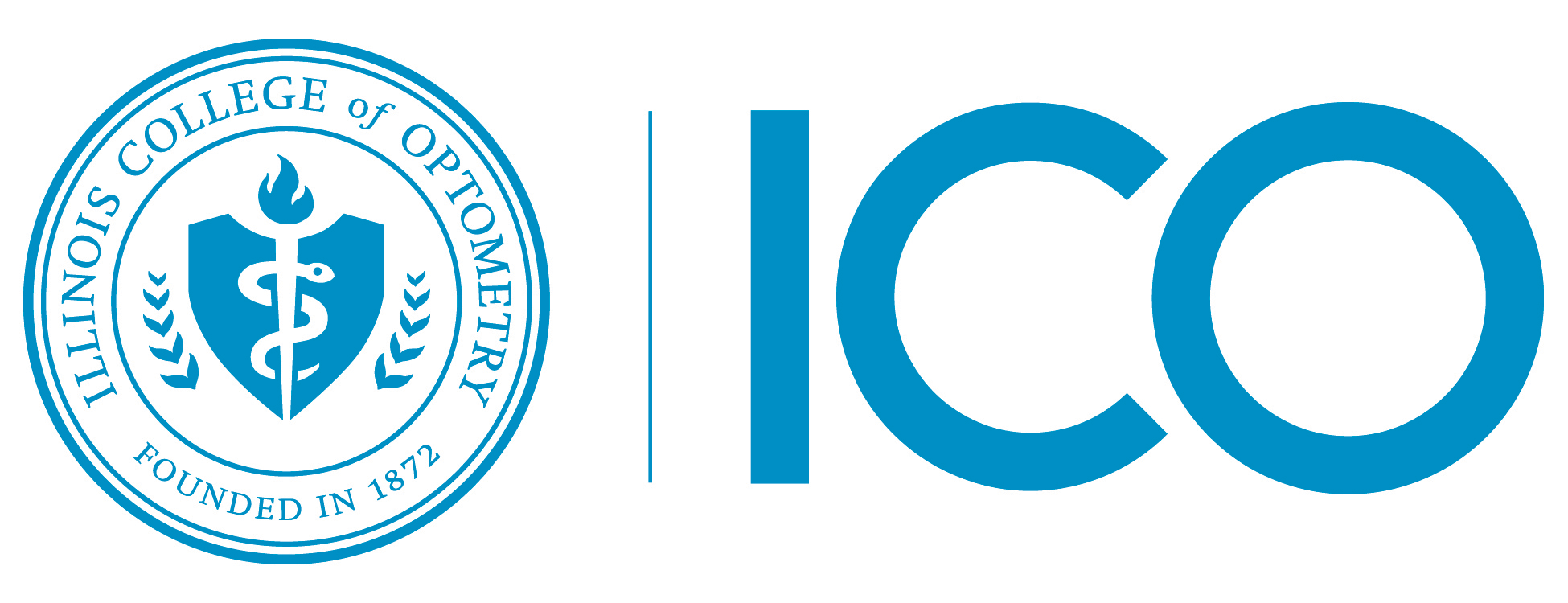
- Type: Private optometry college
- Established: 1872; 154 years ago
- President: Mark Colip
- Administrative staff: 48
- Students: 616
- Location: Chicago, Illinois, United States; 41.8348°N 87.6233°W
- Website: ico.edu

The Illinois College of Optometry (ICO) is a private optometry college in Chicago, Illinois. Graduating approximately 160 optometrists a year, it is the largest optometry college in the United States and the oldest continually operating educational facility dedicated solely to the teaching of optometrists. The college complex incorporates more than 366,000 square feet (34,000 m^{2}) including an on-site eye care clinic, electronically enhanced lecture center, library, computerized clinical learning equipment, cafeteria, fitness center, and living facilities.

== History ==
The Illinois College of Optometry was formed by the merger in 1955 of the Northern Illinois College of Optometry (NICO) and the Chicago College of Optometry (CCO).

== Facilities ==
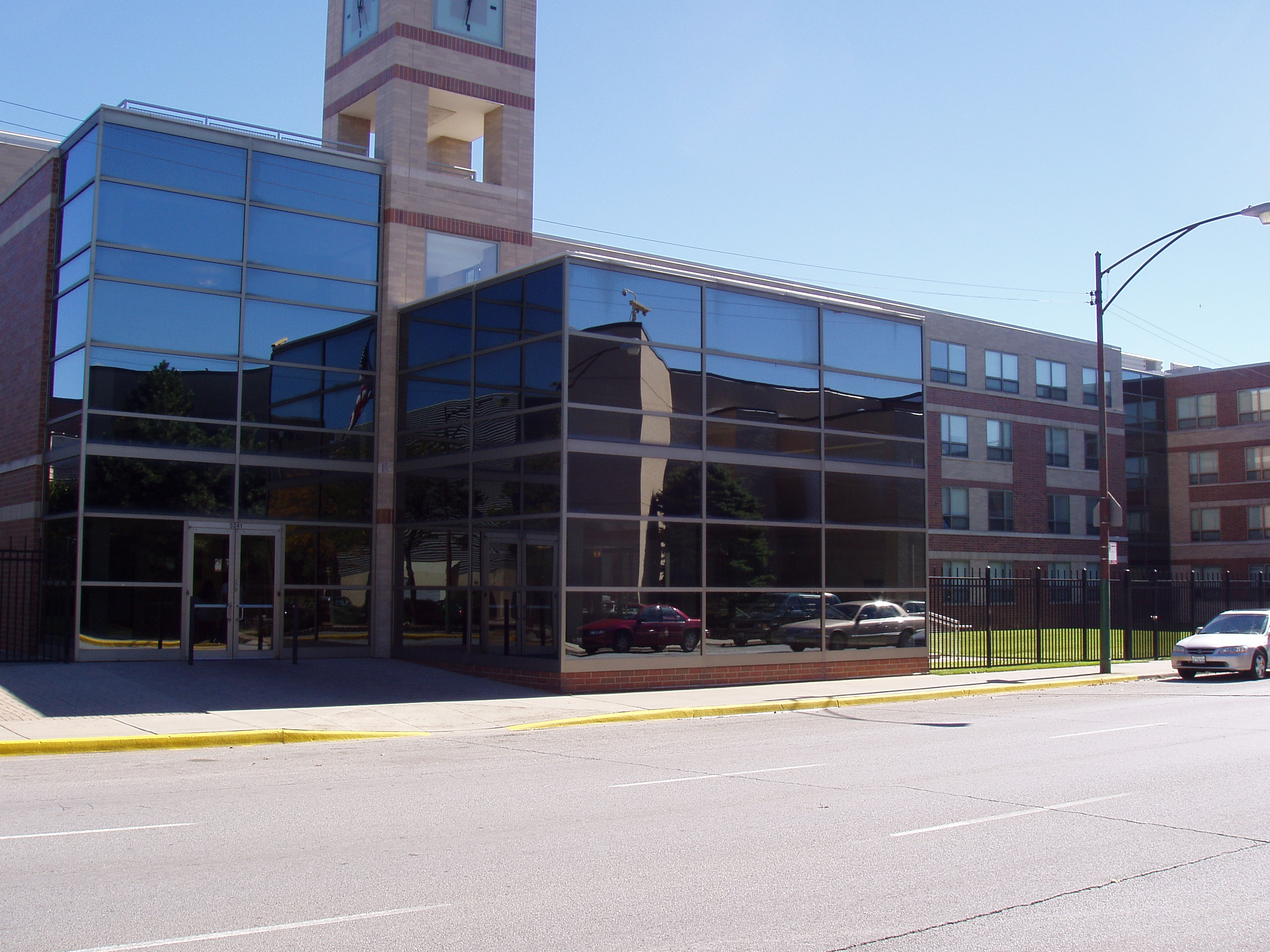
The front of the RC.

The Illinois Eye Institute (IEI) is the principal clinical training facility for ICO students and is located adjacent to the college. In addition to primary eye care, sub-specialty care is available including glaucoma, retina-vitreous, neuro-ophthalmic disorders, cornea-external disease, orbit-oculoplastics, pediatrics/strabismus-amblyopia and low vision rehabilitation. Additional service areas within the IEI include The Alfred and Sarah Rosenbloom Center on Vision and Aging, Diabetic Eye Center, and Bronzeville Pharmacy. The IEI serves as a center for clinical research involving eye and vision problems including glaucoma, age-related macular degeneration (ARMD), cornea and contact lenses, and pediatric eye disorders.

== Academics ==
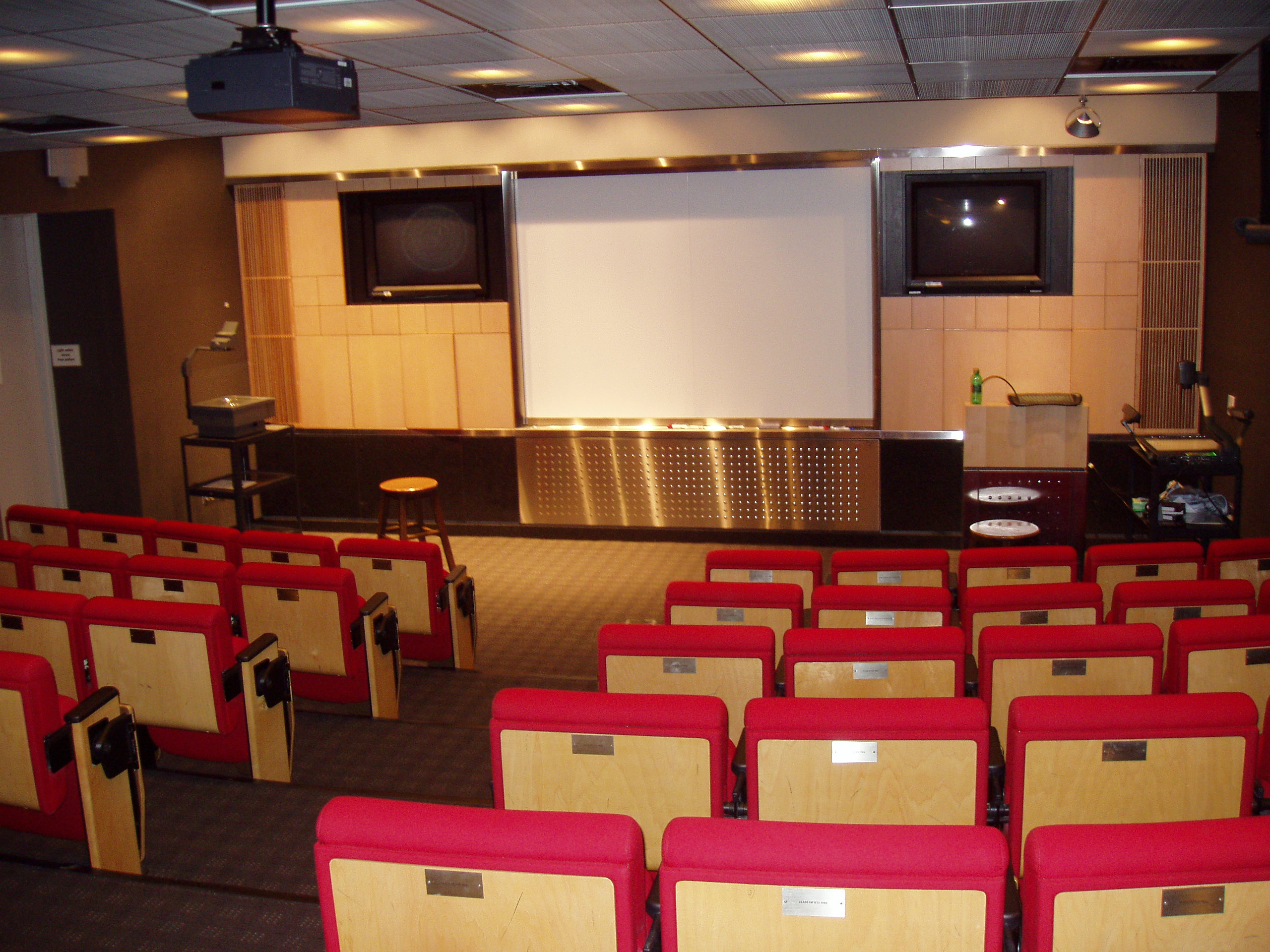
The Adams Center.

The Illinois College of Optometry awards the degrees of Doctor of Optometry (O.D.) and Bachelor of Science in Visual Science (BSVS). The college also offers a joint program with the Department of Ophthalmology and Visual Sciences at the University of Chicago to obtain an O.D. Degree and a Master of Science (M.S.) or Doctor of Philosophy (Ph.D.) degree. In addition, the college also offers a joint program with the Illinois Institute of Technology, where a student may obtain a BS in biology from IIT and an O.D. degree from the Illinois College of Optometry.

== Notable alumni ==
- Donald L. Iverson, member of the Wisconsin State Assembly
- Chelsea Laden, retired professional ice hockey player and Destination Fear (2019 TV series) host
- Otto Frederick Rohwedder, inventor of bread slicing machine
- William Townsend, optometrist, Arkansas state legislator
- Bob Whittaker, U.S. Representative from Kansas
