= List of Paranormal State episodes =

This is an episode list of the A&E reality television series Paranormal State. The second column is A&E's episode numbering system from their website.

== Series overview ==
Season	Episodes	Originally released	
Season	Episodes	First released	Last released
1	20	December 10, 2007	March 24, 2008
2	12	July 28, 2008	October 27, 2008
3	20	January 19, 2009	May 18, 2009
4	12	December 15, 2009	February 9, 2010
5	21	October 17, 2010	May 2, 2011

=== Season 1 (2007–08) ===
Chron. no.	Prod. no.	Title	Original release date
101 (1)	14	"Sixth Sense"	December 10, 2007
The Paranormal Research Society (PRS) are called in to help a young boy who claims to see dead people. The case strikes a chord with team leader Ryan Buell who says he experienced similar phenomena as a child.
102 (2)	9	"The Name"	December 10, 2007
The PRS are called to Elizabethtown, Pennsylvania to help a woman who claims to be experiencing paranormal activity in a home that was the site of brutal murders. It is claimed that an entity taunts Ryan by name during the investigation.
103 (3)	10	"The Devil in Syracuse"	December 17, 2007
The PRS takes on what they feel is a taunting demonic force in a client's home that results in the necessity to carry out an exorcism.
104 (4)	1	"Dark Man"	December 17, 2007
The PRS carries out a pagan cleansing in an isolated farmhouse whose owner fears her deceased son's spirit is being held in purgatory by another evil force called "The Dark Man."
105 (5)	12	"Vegas"	December 24, 2007
The PRS goes to Las Vegas to interview a 14-year-old medium who claims she is in contact with a spirit named Emily, and the case may have connections with a possible murder in San Antonio.
106 (6)	15	"Pet Cemetery"	December 24, 2007
The PRS is called to Camden, Maine to help a woman who believes an evil presence is responsible for unusual animal deaths on her property and she fears her beloved dog may be the next target.
107 (7)	2	"The Cemetery"	December 31, 2007
The PRS investigates a cemetery in Clearfield, PA whose caretaker claims he and his wife are the targets of a ghostly presence. Ryan finds an unmarked urn of human remains and suggests it may be the reason for the haunting.
108 (8)	5	"Man of the House"	December 31, 2007
The PRS tries to help a woman and her grandson who believe they have stirred up ghostly activity on a 19th-century Tobyhanna, Pennsylvania house they are renovating. The team hopes a relative of the home's former owner can help the spirit pass on.
109 (9)	7	"Beer, Wine & Spirits"	January 7, 2008
The PRS investigates claims of aggressive spirit activity in a bar by a spirit named "Charley" that likes to break wine glasses.
110 (10)	16	"Shape Shifter"	January 14, 2008
The PRS team is called to Belfast, Maine to investigate a woman's claims of attacks by a winged creature. Psychic Chip Coffey believes the entity is a half-human/half-beast spirit and a local Native American shaman is called in to assist.
111 (11)	6	"Paranormal Intervention"	January 21, 2008
The PRS team joins notable paranormal investigator Lorraine Warren to review a woman's EVP recordings and her belief that she has found a portal to the "other side."
112 (12)	8	"School House Haunting"	January 28, 2008
The PRS investigates a converted schoolhouse in Chatham, Massachusetts whose latest owners claim they hear voices of children. They interpret an EVP recording to contain the name "Katie" that Ryan traces back to the name of a former tenant.
113 (13)	11	"The Haunted Piano"	February 4, 2008
The PRS joins researcher Lorraine Warren in investigating a couple's home who claim that disturbances began when they purchased an antique piano.
114 (14)	4	"Woman in the Window"	February 11, 2008
The PRS investigates claims of paranormal activity in a historic family home once connected with the Underground Railroad.
115 (15)	17	"Requiem"	February 18, 2008
The PRS tries to help a terrified mother and daughter who live in a 19th-century farmhouse in Coudersport, Pennsylvania, and claim there is spiritual activity in both the house and the barn. Ryan believes the haunting may be connected to the home's tragic family history.
116 (16)	20	"The Asylum"	February 25, 2008
The PRS team investigates claims of spirit activity at a prison and former mental asylum in Romulus, New York. They also test out a new piece of technology known as "Frank's Box" – a purported radio for communicating with the dead.
117 (17)	13	"Mothman"	March 3, 2008
The PRS go to Point Pleasant, West Virginia, site of the Mothman legend – a winged creature said to be the harbinger of doom and destruction – and look at possible connections between the creature, an Indian burial site and a top-secret government installation.
118 (18)	3	"Freshmen Fear"	March 10, 2008
The PRS interviews an anxious college student who claims to see a ghost in her dorm. Ryan digs further, uncovering reports of mysterious campus deaths, urban legends and a possible dark connection to a Japanese candle game.
119 (19)	19	"The Knickerbocker"	March 17, 2008
Joined by psychic CJ Sellers, the PRS seeks to find paranormal causes for a series of mysterious illnesses and deaths of guests who have stayed at the historic Knickerbocker Hotel in Linesville, Pennsylvania.
120 (20)	20	"The Sensitive"	March 24, 2008
The PRS tries to help a young girl who claims she is being tormented by a black mist. Ryan and psychic Chip Coffey try to determine if it is teenage stress, or demonic possession.

=== Season 2 (2008) ===
Chron. no.	Prod. no.	Title	Original release date
201 (21)	23	"Good vs. Evil"	July 28, 2008
The PRS claims strange activity during a "dead time" investigation of a Western Pennsylvania home hey believe is cursed by an evil spirit that damages religious objects, leaves dead animals as gifts and meddles with electronic equipment.
202 (22)	21	"Family Ties"	July 28, 2008
The PRS investigates a Petersburg, Virginia home where it is claimed the apparition of an old woman torments the family's son, but when psychic CJ Sellers questions the boy's father, he opens up about a dark event in their past.
203 (23)	25	"Haunted Ranch"	August 4, 2008
The PRS visits a ranch in Hunt, Texas where several animals were lost in sudden deaths claimed to be unexplained. Psychic Chip Coffey claims to detect a furious presence lurking on the property and a local Native American suggests the team appease the spirit with a sacrificial bonfire.
204 (24)	22	"Smoke & Shadows"	August 4, 2008
The PRS investigates a Parkville, Maryland, home whose owner claims has been invaded by an unseen force that arrived shortly after her roommate moved in. A supposed photo of the entity is claimed to mean something personal to the home owner.
205 (25)	27	"Hell's Gate"	August 11, 2008
The PRS declare a paranormal emergency for a York, Pennsylvania man who says he is terrorized by an evil entity that has turned his life upside down. Fearing for the man's health and sanity, the team calls upon clergy to ask if an exorcism may be necessary.
206 (26)	26	"The Ladder"	August 18, 2008
The PRS team investigates a home in Shrewsbury, Massachusetts, supposedly haunted by an evil presence that has stalked a family for over 40 years, but one member's dreams about a ladder is claimed to hold clues to why it is happening.
207 (27)	28	"The Messenger"	August 25, 2008
The PRS team investigates a coastal home in Bandon, Oregon whose owners claim they see a headless apparition and hear disembodied cries for help.
208 (28)	29	"Hide & Seek"	September 1, 2008
The PRS come to the aid of a Newburgh, Indiana, mother and her nine-year-old son who claim they are being harassed by a shadowy figure. Psychic Kim Russo claims to detect a ghost that "plays hard to get" and interprets EVPs as proof there are more ghosts in the house.
209 (29)	31	"The Glove"	September 8, 2008
The PRS joins up with technical expert Chad Calek and psychic Michelle Belanger as they help a Daisytown, Pennsylvania couple who claim the spiritual activity in their home is ruining their marriage.
210 (30)	32	"The Fire"	September 15, 2008
The PRS interview a woman named Christina who claims she has been encountering ghostly phenomena ever since the murder of her parents a year ago. When other members of her family come forward and say the same, the team calls upon psychic Chip Coffey who claims to have possible new clues in the murder case.
211 (31)	33	"First Contact"	September 29, 2008
The PRS visits a ranch in Deer Park, Washington State that is a supposed hotbed of paranormal activity such as the sighting of UFOs and winged creatures in the nearby woods.
212 (32)	29	"I Am Six"	October 27, 2008
The PRS try to help a 26-year-old woman named Laura who claims she is attacked and left sickened by an unseen force. Investigating further, the team becomes convinced Laura is possessed by a demon who calls itself "Six". (1-hour show)

=== Season 3 (2009) ===
Chron. no.	Prod. no.	Title	Original release date
301 (33)	34	"Desperate Households"	January 19, 2009
The PRS investigates a family's new dream home in Bloomingdale, New Jersey that they claim is haunted. Ryan looks into the history of the property which leads the team into literally digging up the yard for an explanation.
302 (34)	37	"Laws of Attraction"	January 19, 2009
The PRS and guest investigator Lorraine Warren come to the aid of a woman named Paula who claims her autistic son Michael, who has limited verbal skills, utters words told to him by a "scary dead boy."
303 (35)	24	"Lady Vampire"	January 26, 2009
The PRS team helps a woman and her 5-year-old daughter who claim they are tormented by a dark entity they call the "Lady Vampire." The case brings back bad memories for Ryan who relates it to his own claimed haunting experiences when he was a child.
304 (36)	35	"Room & Board"	January 26, 2009
The PRS investigates claims of strange activity surrounding a North Hudson, New York vacation lodge. Ryan investigates the lodge's former owners, and claims to discover the "paranormal pastime" of one of the lodge's caretakers.
305 (37)	40	"Church of the Damned"	February 2, 2009
The PRS investigates an abandoned church in Greensburg, Kansas whose owner halted renovations after claims of a haunting. Supposedly, local residents refer to it as a church of evil. Father Bob Bailey and psychic Chip Coffey claim have "a battle with dark forces".
306 (38)	36	"The Firehouse"	February 2, 2009
The PRS investigates a fire department in Clementon, New Jersey where the members claim they are still visited by one of their own named "Joe" -- years after his death.
307 (39)	39	"The Anniversary"	February 9, 2009
The PRS and psychic Michelle Belanger interview a family in Russell Springs, Kentucky who claim they are being haunted by the ghost of a little girl who cries for her mother. The team claims the spirit may be that of a girl murdered 100 years ago, and who also has a family connection to the current homeowners.
308 (40)	38	"The Sickness"	February 16, 2009
The PRS investigates a family home whose members attribute their health problems to the paranormal. The team discovers a family history of health issues and look for a natural cause, but the case becomes urgent when one of the family is rushed to the hospital.
309 (41)	41	"The Drowned"	February 23, 2009
The PRS investigates a seaside home in Brunswick, Maryland whose owners claim to have been frightened away by apparitions of children and strange noises coming from a nearby creek. The team says they have found historical evidence for the site being haunted.
310 (42)	42	"The Fury"	March 2, 2009
The PRS tries to help a family in Buckhannon, West Virginia who claims to be haunted by a floating head. The husband claims he was attacked by a knife, the wife claims she was burned. They claim the children claim were tormented by frightening premonitions.
311 (43)	43	"The Basement"	March 16, 2009
The PRS joins psychic Michelle Belanger in an investigation of a woman's home in Jefferson, Ohio where they claim unseen forces move furniture and the sounds of chains rattle in the basement. Team member Sergey finds his language skills put to use when recorded EVPs appear to be in a foreign tongue.
312 (44)	48	"Room 37"	March 23, 2009
The PRS are joined by psychic Michelle Belanger as they investigate a bed and breakfast in Athens, Tennessee where occupants claim to have heard whistling and seen images of a man walking the halls. It is also claimed a terrifying apparition of a girl in Room 37 has chased guests away in the middle of the night.
313 (45)	46	"The Soul Collector"	March 30, 2009
The PRS investigates a home in Flemington, New Jersey where alleged paranormal activity is frightening a mother and daughter. Psychic Chip Coffey offers information about the former owner who collected dolls and a supposed twist in the case.
314 (46)	47	"Lady in White"	April 6, 2009
The PRS is called to a historic estate in Burnsville, North Carolina where the owners claim paranormal activity has forced them to live in a separate cabin on the property. During the case, the team's surveillance cameras record what they consider to be their best evidence to date.
315 (47)	(44/45)	"The Possession: Return of Six"	April 13, 2009
The PRS is called to help a girl in Wickliffe, Kentucky named Debbie who claims to see a figure with ram's horns. It is claimed that a similar figure had also "tormented" Debbie's sister, a suicide. The team says the case bears striking similarities to another case involving a former client.
316 (48)	49	"The Raven"	April 20, 2009
The PRS joins demonologist Lorraine Warren and Father Bob Bailey on a case involving a woman in Milford, Delaware who claims she has been choked by an evil spirit that manifests in the form of a ghostly raven.
317 (49)	50	"Ghosts of Gettysburg"	April 27, 2009
The PRS are called to a Gettysburg, Pennsylvania bed and breakfast whose owners believe they have stirred up some Civil War spirit activity during their renovation. They report seeing shadows, hearing footsteps and a loud boom that seems to sound every night at 3:02 AM.
318 (50)	51	"Three Like Mine"	May 4, 2009
The PRS are called by a woman named Heather from Fowler, Indiana, who claims her family is terrorized by nightly activity. She says she was slapped and heard someone shout "Hey" followed by the phrase "three to nine." Psychic Michelle Belanger tries to decipher the cryptic message while Ryan discovers the client has a more personal connection to the paranormal.
319 (51)	53	"Dead and Back"	May 11, 2009
The PRS helps a Gulf Shores, Alabama woman named Viki who believes a brain aneurysm that almost took her life has opened the door to paranormal activity. Psychic Chip Coffey claims to detect a male spirit with family ties in her home while the rest of the team tests out some new ghost hunting technology.
320 (52)	52	"Devil's Nest"	May 18, 2009
The PRS investigate a family cabin in Weber City, Virginia where the father claims he was scratched by an unseen force and reports seeing a strange wolf-like creature on the property. Ryan uncovers the tragic history of the cabin, while team member Patrick offers information he say may explain the haunting. (1-hour show)

=== Season 4 (2009–2010) ===
Chron. no.	Prod. no.	Title	Original release date
401 (53)	59	"Suicide Possession"	December 15, 2009
The PRS interview Joan and Tony, a couple in Newton, New Jersey who claim a dark presence is influencing their behavior. Ryan learns former tenants of their home committed suicide and seeks demonologist Lorraine Warren's opinions on the possibility that Tony is possessed. (1-hour show)
402 (54)	56	"Invitation of Evil"	December 22, 2009
The PRS urgently respond to a family in Elkin, North Carolina who claims an evil shadow person lurks in their home. They claim to have seen a crib levitate, heard growls and foul language from their three-year-old daughter who Ryan fears is the target of an entity.
403 (55)	55	"Dead Legends"	December 22, 2009
The PRS investigates the famed Hotel Conneaut in northern Pennsylvania whose staff claim ghostly activity, such as seeing apparitions of a boy, a bride and a butcher. The team records what they feel is eye-opening evidence and learns a surprise twist in the case.
404 (56)	62	"Boy Pushed Me"	December 29, 2009
The PRS helps a terrified couple in Nashville, Indiana named Bruce and Danielle who claim an EVP recording contained a sinister voice that said "Kill them all." They also claim their young son barely survived a mysterious fall from a window where he said afterward, a "Boy pushed me."
405 (57)	58	"Haunted Sex Dungeon"	December 29, 2009
The PRS helps a mansion owner on Grayhaven Island near Detroit who claims disembodied voices, banging and a string of bad luck has left him a prisoner in his own home. The team uncovers a Native American connection to the land. The team claims an EVP recording says "Get out", leading them to suspect something more went on at the property.
406 (58)	54	"Dark Practice"	January 5, 2010
The PRS assists a terrified woman who claims a hooded figure is haunting her home in Keyser, West Virginia which may be the same entity that tormented her late husband, a physician, who suffered a grisly demise.
407 (59)	57	"Satan's Soldier"	January 5, 2010
The PRS investigates a home in Brownstown, Indiana whose owners, Paula and Mike, claim a noisy racket keeps them awake at night. After the team discover what they claim is a blood stain on the basement floor, they say the house has a history of violence and they say their clients are keeping "dark secrets".
408 (60)	61	"Darkness Falls"	January 12, 2010
The PRS goes ghost hunting in one of the most allegedly haunted locations in the United States – the West Virginia State Penitentiary. Psychic Michelle Belanger and Father Bob Bailey join the team.
409 (61)	63	"Shadow Caster"	January 19, 2010
The PRS joins a team consisting of psychic investigator John Oliver and friends from the Alabama Paranormal Society on a case in Ozark, Alabama involving a woman and her two daughters who claim to have fled their home after seeing shadow people and recording an EVP that told them to "Get out of here."
410 (62)	64	"Night Terrors"	January 26, 2010
The PRS tries to help a family in Duluth, Georgia who claim to have been forced to sleep in their living room after apparitions of little girls and an inhuman entity chased them from their bedrooms. Psychic and demonologist Lorraine Warren joins the investigation.
411 (63)	60	"Lost Souls"	February 2, 2010
The PRS answers a call from a woman in Kittanning, Pennsylvania who claims she and her son have encountered the ghost of little boy in their home who calls for his mommy. Psychic Michelle Belanger arrives and claims to detect a child's presence and a possible connection to a local murder.
412 (64)	66	"Devil in Jersey"	February 9, 2010
The PRS joins UFO investigator William J. Birnes and delves into the Pine Barrens on the hunt for the legendary Jersey Devil. Thermal camera footage they interpret as showing a deer-like figure with wings is said to match some eyewitness descriptions of the creature.

=== Season 5 (2010–11) ===
Chron. no.	Prod. no.	Title	Original release date
501 (65)	72	"Death Room"	October 17, 2010
The PRS has a case in Ryan's hometown of Sumter, South Carolina where they help the new owner of the Hodge Plantation uncover their property's dark history which leads to revealing some painful family secrets as well.
502 (66)	69	"They Only Come Out At Night"	October 17, 2010
The PRS goes to Weymouth, Massachusetts to help the family of a police officer who claim they are being physically terrorized by a menacing spirit.
503 (67)	71	"Spirits of the Slave Dungeon"	October 24, 2010
The PRS has a two night investigation in a purportedly haunted Charleston, South Carolina jail where they claim the spirits of former slaves are still being held against their will by the long lasting wounds of social injustice.
504 (68)	68	"Ghost on the Tracks"	October 24, 2010
The PRS investigate "Dave and Micheal's Salon" in Berlin, New Jersey. They claim a deadly accident on a nearby train track may cause paranormal activity. When stories of a young mother's murder/suicide come to light, the team tries to figure out if it's fact or urban legend.
505 (69)	74	"Supernatural Seduction"	October 31, 2010
The PRS investigate the Campbell House, a bed and breakfast in Eugene, Oregon, where female guests have claimed to have had sexual encounters with an incubus-like spirit that they say may be tied to a family tragedy. Investigator Katrina invites the supposed entity to lie in bed with her.
506 (70)	67	"Return of the Dead: Glove II"	October 31, 2010
The PRS return to the Kucera home in Daisytown, Pennsylvania, where it is claimed that paranormal activity has intensified after the team's first investigation. The team claims to have discovered a phantom glove print on a wall and linked it to homeowner Lisa's abusive Great Grandfather.
507 (71)	75	"Paranormal Detour"	November 7, 2010
With time off between cases, the PRS visit a random town, picking St. Helens, Oregon, They visit the local historic society for info on alleged paranormal hotspots and investigate the Klondike Restaurant where they say a murder may have taken place.
508 (72)	70	"Ghosts of the Forgotten"	November 7, 2010
Ryan's friend Eilfie asks him and the team to investigate the historic Lake County Poor House in Painesville, Ohio, which once served as a dumping ground for society's outcasts and the mentally ill. Ryan tries a sensory deprivation technique called the Ganzfeld experiment in an attempt to stir up paranormal activity.
509 (73)	76	"Who Is the Lurking Man?"	November 14, 2010
The PRS go to Newcastle, California to investigate claimed paranormal activity at a home. Ryan believes the home's location near Native American land may be reason for the haunting, and that the family may have invited the activity upon themselves.
510 (74)	77	"Do Bad Things"	November 14, 2010
The PRS helps a Miamisburg, Ohio woman named Heather who believes an evil presence in her family home contributed to the suicide of her sister Missy and generated aggressive behavior in her two brothers. The brothers claim disembodied voices told them to harm themselves and commit murder.
511 (75)	65	"Dwelling of the Dead"	November 21, 2010
The PRS are called to help a single mother and young son who claim to have been physically assaulted by an evil spirit in their home.
512 (76)	73	"Haunted Homecoming"	November 28, 2010
The PRS returns to Sumter, South Carolina, Ryan's hometown, to investigate the case of a boy tragically shot and killed by a teenager while trick-or-treating on Halloween.
513 (77)	78	"Bedroom Eyes"	November 28, 2010
The PRS team helps a rural Pennsylvania family who believes their new farm to be haunted. Interesting Note: Both The Roku Channel and Discovery+ streaming channels break Season 5 at this episode, and begin airing the remaining episodes as "Season 6." Both streaming channels also reverse the playing order of Hostage to Fear and Haunted Connection, with the latter starting off the "6th" season.
514 (78)	81	"Hostage to Fear"	April 11, 2011
The PRS help a New Ringgold, Pennsylvania family who claim to have been dealing with paranormal activity for some time, but the team realizes they have become prisoners in their own home and investigate the history of the property to seek answers they believe will help the family.
515 (79)	83	"Haunted Connection"	April 11, 2011
The PRS is called in to help a young mother named Kimberley who believes she is being tormented by the spirit of a teenage girl who was raped and murdered in her neighborhood years ago — which is still an unsolved case.
516 (80)	82	"Permission to Do Harm"	April 18, 2011
The PRS helps a Needmore, Pennsylvania family allegedly plagued by poltergeist activity allegedly involving a mirror. The team claims the hostile spirit is haunting the children's dreams and seek the blessing of a priest to drive it from the home.
517 (81)	79	"Devil's Hostage"	April 18, 2011
The PRS helps a woman who claims to have been scratched by an evil entity that she says could be the Devil, but when the woman's credibility comes into question, a struggle of another kind emerges for Ryan and the rest of the team.
518 (82)	80	"Vendetta"	April 25, 2011
The PRS takes a case in the Poconos Mountains of Pennsylvania to help a client who claims that when her boyfriend moved in, a vengeful paranormal presence moved in with him.
519 (83)	85	"Southern Discomfort at Sweetwater Mansion"	April 25, 2011
The PRS investigate the Sweetwater Mansion in Florence, Alabama. The caretaker and volunteers at the property share stories of paranormal activity. The team claim to discover the identity of spirits and past events they believe has caused a haunting.
520 (84)	84	"Get Out of This House"	May 2, 2011
The PRS investigate the home of a Monroeville, Pennsylvania family who claim to be tormented by a hostile entity. The team claim that the client may have unwittingly invited the entity in, and work to rid the presence from the home.
521 (85)	86	"If I Should Die..."	May 2, 2011
Paranormal investigator Ken Arrington joins the PRS team on an investigation of a family home in Huntington, Indiana claimed to be demonically possessed. Interesting Note: Both The Roku Channel and Discovery+ streaming channels show the opening credits for this episode as "Paranormal State: The New Class". It includes a completely new cast of investigators and is shown as the final episode of "Season 6".

== Special ==
Title	Original release date
"Paranormal State: The New Class"	October 21, 2010
Sibling EMTs face off against the paranormal.
