= Madison Seminary =

United States historic place

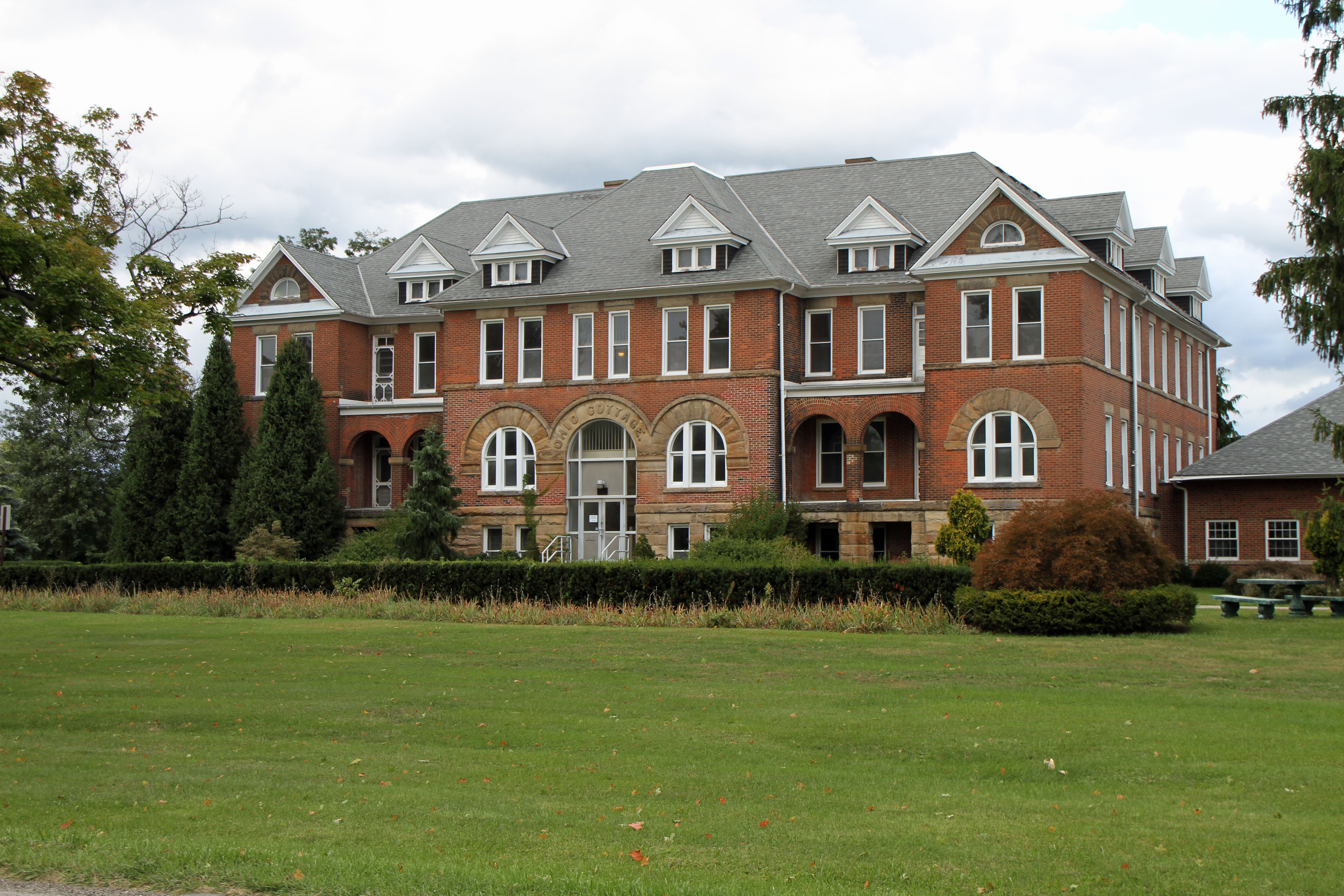
- Picture of Madison Seminary and Home
- Interactive map of the Madison Seminary area
- Former names: Home of the Ohio Soldiers, Sailors, Marines, Their Wives, Mothers, Widows, and Army Nurses; Opportunity Village

General information
- Status: Operating
- Classification: School (1845 - 1881); Charitable Housing (1890 - June 30, 1962); Hospital
- Location: 6769 Middle Ridge Road, Madison, Ohio, USA
- Coordinates: 41.7904657°N 81.0477669°W
- Current tenants: The Mad Project LLC
- Completed: 1847

Design and construction
- Known for: Hauntings

Website
- www.madisonseminary.com
- Madison Seminary and Home
- U.S. National Register of Historic Places
- NRHP reference No.: 79001871
- Added to NRHP: February 22, 1979

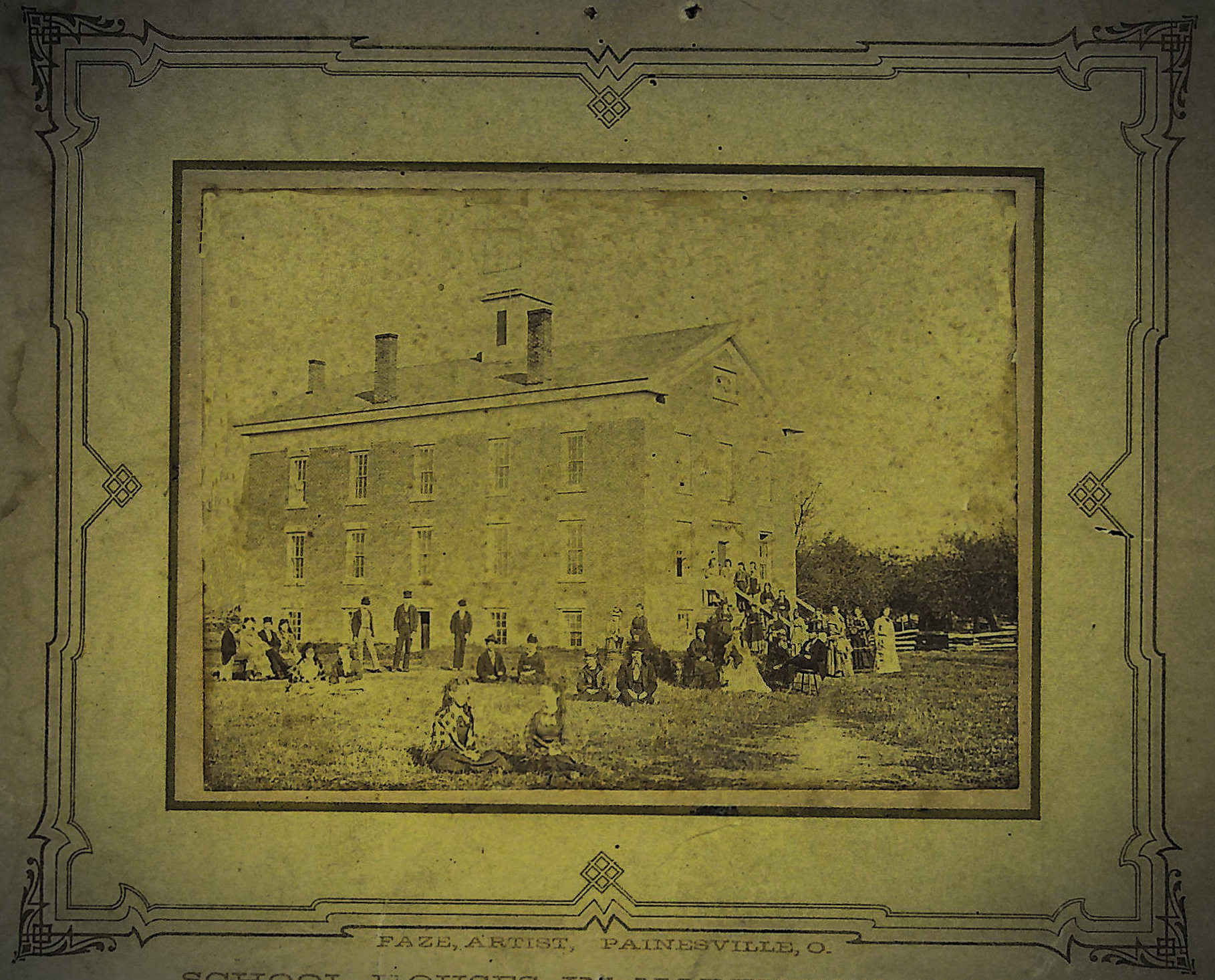
Madison Seminary 1873 with students and teachers

Madison Seminary is a historic building in Madison, Ohio. Currently in private ownership, it previously functioned as a school, hospital, and as housing for the families of those killed in the American Civil War. It currently has notoriety as one of the most supposedly haunted places in Ohio.

== School ==
In the first three years of operation, the Madison Seminary was also known as Madison High School and Madison Academy. Opened in 1846 at the Meeting House (corner of Hubbard and Middle Ridge Roads AKA Genung Corner) under the name of Madison High School. Cyrus Hartwell as the first teacher and taught both male and female students. The school searched for female teachers to teacher the female students. By the 1848–49, the number of students reached more than one hundred fifty. The school was moved to the property that the far East building is currently located.

The original wooden building was replaced with the current red brick building that was finished in 1857. Students held fund raisers to help finish and furnish the school.

The old building served as dorms for students who lived too far to travel daily to school. The school charged a fee for the dorms as well as the classes.

Most male teachers only stayed a year or two before moving on but two female teachers Miss R.J. Smith and Miss Martha Chadwick taught for more than 10 years including during the Civil War.

The final principal was Mrs. N.A.S Bliss who chose to move to Buffalo. Teaching with her, was former Seminary student Miss Melva Latham. However, due to changes in Ohio laws for common schools (public schools), and declining enrollment, the Madison Seminary closed its doors forever as a school in 1881.

== Woman's Relief Corps Home ==
The buildings set unused until Woman's Relief Corps (WRC) member, Mrs. Cowles, of Geneva, attended the WRC National Meeting in Milwaukee. The WRC was searching for a place to create a home for Civil War nurses, widows, mothers, daughters and wives of men who fought in the war. During the meeting, Mrs. Cowles suggested the buildings of the Madison Seminary. Upon return to Ohio, she set about the negotiations for the visitation of delegates of the WRC and then purchase of the buildings when they were chosen as the site of the WRC Home.

In 1891, the building was sold to the WRC, the women's branch of the Grand Army of the Republic, and housed veteran nurses and female family members of fallen soldiers, for whom no provisions had been made following the defeat of the confederacy. The Women's Relief Corps, as they were known, built the western section of the building. By 1902, the WRC found itself having financial difficulty in the upkeep of the Home. By the fall, the WRC local branches were voting to turn the buildings over to the State of Ohio for maintenance and care of the residents and building. The building was then donated to the state of Ohio when they could no longer afford its upkeep.

== Ohio Department of Mental Hygiene and Corrections ==
On June 30, 1962, the Ohio Department of Mental Hygiene and Corrections took over ownership of the building and evicted the widows still living at the property. This project was shelved in 1975 when the county bought the property.

== Private ownership ==
The property passed into private ownership in 1993, and remains on the National Register of Historic Places.

== Supposed hauntings ==
After the building fell into disuse, rumors began to spread that the property was haunted. The initial Ad placed by the city when they sold Madison Seminary read: May Be Haunted. Since then the building has been the site of numerous ghost hunts and has featured on Destination Fear and Most Terrifying Places in America.
