= Donald L. Iverson =

American politician

Donald L. Iverson (February 3, 1923 – March 20, 1999) was an American politician, who served in the Wisconsin State Assembly.

== Biography ==
Iverson was born in St. Croix Falls, Wisconsin. After graduating from St. Croix Falls High School, he attended the University of Wisconsin-River Falls and the Illinois College of Optometry. During World War II, Iverson served in the United States Army in the Middle East Theatre.

== Political career ==
Iverson was elected to the Assembly in 1964. Additionally, he was a member of the St. Croix County, Wisconsin Board of Supervisors and a Hudson, Wisconsin alderman. He was a Democrat.
