= Destination Fear (2019 TV series) =

Paranormal reality television show

- Genre: Paranormal; Reality
- Starring: Alex Schroeder; Chelsea Laden; Dakota Laden; Tanner Wiseman
- Country of origin: United States
- Original language: English
- No. of seasons: 4
- No. of episodes: 48

Production
- Executive producers: Zak Bagans; Jonathan Grosskopf; Joe Townley; Dakota Laden; Michael Yudin
- Producers: Dakota Laden; Laura Marini; Dominika Michalowska; Kerry Miles
- Cinematography: Christian Meyers; John Kelleran (2019); Rick Randall (2019)
- Editors: Dominika Michalowska; Anais Blondet (2019–20); Dakota Laden (2019); Carla Beth Smith (2019–21); Jennifer Piazza (2020); Michael Wei (2020–23); Madeline Parksmith (2021–22); James Taylor (2021)
- Running time: 60 minutes (inc. commercials)
- Production company: MY Entertainment

Original release
- Network: Travel Channel
- Release: October 26, 2019 – January 13, 2023

Destination Fear is an American paranormal reality television series that aired on Travel Channel from October 26, 2019 to January 13, 2023.

== Premise ==
Destination Fear is a paranormal documentary featuring Dakota Laden and his team of paranormal enthusiasts, including his sister, Chelsea Laden, and friends Tanner Wiseman and Alex Schroeder. The team takes to the road in an RV, visiting a number of reportedly haunted and paranormal hotspots across the United States, testing the limits of human fear.

== Cast ==
- Dakota Laden
- Chelsea Laden
- Tanner Wiseman
- Alex Schroeder

== Production ==
On August 20, 2019, the series was officially announced and premiered on October 26, 2019. In March 2020, the series was renewed for a second season, which premiered on April 29, 2020. On June 29, 2021, the series was renewed for a third season, which premiered on July 24, 2021. On May 18, 2022, the series was renewed for a fourth season, which premiered on November 25, 2022. In March 2023, Dakota Laden announced that the series had been cancelled, and launched a Kickstarter for a follow-up series titled Project Fear.

== Episodes ==
=== Series overview ===
Season	Episodes	Originally released	
Season	Episodes	First released	Last released
1	10	October 26, 2019	December 28, 2019
2	14	April 29, 2020	December 15, 2020
3	16	July 24, 2021	December 25, 2021
4	8	November 25, 2022	January 13, 2023

=== Season 1 (2019) ===
No. overall	No. in season	Title	Location	Original release date	U.S. viewers (millions)
1	1	"Brushy Mountain State Penitentiary"	Petros, Tennessee	October 26, 2019	0.44
In the series premiere, Dakota surprises Chelsea and Tanner with the news that they are headed to Brushy State Penitentiary in Petros, Tennessee, known as the "Alcatraz of the South." Bearing witness to more than 10,000 deaths and housing James Earl Ray, assassin of Martin Luther King Jr., as one of its former inmates, Brushy is rife with paranormal activity. But when Chelsea has a shocking confrontation with an entity inside Ray's cell, and Tanner is threatened by something unknown, Dakota's "fear" experiment takes a terrifying turn.
2	2	"Old South Pittsburg Hospital"	South Pittsburg, Tennessee	November 2, 2019	0.41
The team pushes itself to the edge of sanity as they explore a notoriously haunted hospital in Tennessee. Dakota and Chelsea's sibling bond is tested when she is confronted by an aggressive entity with a grudge against women on the third floor.
3	3	"Sweet Springs Sanatorium"	Sweet Springs, West Virginia	November 9, 2019	0.42
The site of a horrific Native American massacre is the team's darkest, most-terrifying location yet. They are tormented by unexplained screams, terrifying chants and a voice that almost pushes them to the edge of madness.
4	4	"St. Albans Sanatorium"	Radford, Virginia	November 16, 2019	0.45
The team reveals a terrifying twist when they revisit St. Albans Sanatorium in Radford, Virginia, a location so awful that Chelsea quit last time and vowed she would never return. Can the trio conquer St. Albans before it conquers them again?
5	5	"Eloise Psychiatric Hospital"	Westland, Michigan	November 23, 2019	0.37
Dakota, Chelsea and Tanner investigate one of the most-haunted locations in Michigan -- Eloise Psychiatric Hospital. The team begins to lose its grip on reality as it is subjected to unexplained screams, slamming doors and rampant poltergeist activity.
6	6	"Madison Seminary"	Madison, Ohio	November 30, 2019	0.38
Dark forces conspire against the team as they investigate the Madison Seminary, one of the most-haunted locations in Ohio. Terrifying voices, shadow figures and physical contact with a demonic entity leaves them stunned and shaken to the core.
7	7	"Statler Hotel"	Buffalo, New York	December 7, 2019	0.36
Dakota's team is pushed to their limits when they check into a historic hotel in Buffalo, NY. Disembodied voices and shadows are everywhere, but the haunted elevators prove most terrifying when communications fail and they each find themselves alone.
8	8	"West Virginia State Penitentiary"	Moundsville, West Virginia	December 14, 2019	0.39
The team heads to Moundsville, West Virginia, to investigate what was once one of the top ten most-violent prisons in America. Dakota fears he may have to leave some part of his soul behind after he is targeted in a horrific physical attack.
9	9	"Fairfield County Infirmary"	Lancaster, Ohio	December 21, 2019	0.27
The team's terrifying road trip takes them to a house of horrors in Lancaster, Ohio. When Dakota tasks each member to explore the property all alone, Alex encounters something so evil it wouldn't be believed if not caught on video.
10	10	"Pennhurst State School"	Spring City, Pennsylvania	December 28, 2019	0.39
The team faces their biggest paranormal challenge yet when they roll up to an abandoned asylum in Pennsylvania. The hissing, violent entities within leave them wondering if they'll ever return home from their terrifying road trip.

=== Season 2 (2020) ===
No. overall	No. in season	Title	Location	Original release date	U.S. viewers (millions)
11	1	"Nopeming Sanatorium"	Duluth, Minnesota	April 29, 2020	0.30
Dakota, Chelsea and Tanner head home to face the horror of their childhood nightmares, Minnesota's most-notorious sanatorium. The team has never had the courage to confront the terror inside -- until now.
12	2	"Yorktown Memorial Hospital"	Yorktown, Texas	May 6, 2020	0.34
The team investigates a Texas hospital with a gruesome history, including a brutal double homicide. Once under the direction of Catholic nuns, the abandoned building's chapel may house a demonic entity with its sights set on Dakota.
13	3	"Montana State Prison"	Deer Lodge, Montana	May 13, 2020	0.34
The team investigates a former Montana prison haunted by dark entities known for choking, shanking and even possessing visitors. Dakota must overcome his fear of violent spirits in order to survive the night behind the walls of the vile place.
14	4	"Hill View Manor"	New Castle, Pennsylvania	May 20, 2020	0.41
The team heads to New Castle, Pennsylvania, to investigate a former home for the destitute and elderly. Dakota is determined to conquer the terror inside, but things go horribly wrong when Alex leaves the property in a dire paranormal-induced emergency.
15	5	"Cambria County Jail"	Ebensburg, Pennsylvania	May 27, 2020	0.41
Convinced total isolation and disorientation is the only way to push fear to its absolute limits, Dakota leads the team to Ebensburg, Pennsylvania, to investigate a dungeon deep in the bowels of the old Cambria County Jail.
16	6	"Sheboygan County Asylum"	Sheboygan, Wisconsin	June 3, 2020	0.41
Dakota brings the road trip to its most chilling overnight yet, inside a shuttered Wisconsin asylum. They will be the first team ever to sleep inside its abandoned halls, where little is known about why several nurses took their own lives.
17	7	"Saratoga County Homestead"	Providence, New York	October 24, 2020	0.43
Dakota leads Chelsea, Tanner and Alex to a decaying sanitarium where some patient corpses were unclaimed due to a flu pandemic. Screams and darting shadows play mind games with the team as they struggle to pin the activity on the living or the dead.
18	8	"Old Bourbon Distillery"	Frankfort, Kentucky	October 31, 2020	0.44
The team heads to Kentucky to explore one of America's oldest bourbon distilleries. Dakota has a theory that quick and violent deaths cause some of the most intense hauntings, and he believes this sprawling house of horrors is just the place to test it
19	9	"Randolph County Infirmary"	Winchester, Indiana	November 7, 2020	0.43
The team returns to Indiana to explore an abandoned facility that has haunted Tanner's nightmares for the past five years. He has only now mustered up the courage to confront who, or what, terrorized him during their first investigation.
20	10	"Joliet Prison"	Joliet, Illinois	November 14, 2020	0.40
It's sweet revenge for Chelsea when she takes the team to Chicago's historic and utterly terrifying Joliet Prison. Terrible things happen once they separate inside its imposing walls, and one member experiences their most sickening night ever.
21	11	"Rolling Hills Asylum"	East Bethany, New York	November 21, 2020	0.41
Tanner confronts his greatest fear when the team explores an upstate New York asylum said to be haunted by the spirit of a 7-foot-tall man. The unique investigation causes them to completely re-evaluate everything they've ever believed about fear.
22	12	"Trans-Allegheny Lunatic Asylum"	Weston, West Virginia	December 5, 2020	0.39
The team heads to West Virginia to explore the most haunted asylum in America. Dakota has doubts about their ability to combat the bloodthirsty souls lurking in the shadows of the cursed property, but Tanner believes they are up for the challenge.
23	13	"Old Idaho State Penitentiary"	Boise, Idaho	December 12, 2020	0.44
After many nights of torment by the paranormal, Alex finally gets his chance to pick a haunted location for the team to investigate. And he is ready to get even. He has planned the most terrifying experiment for Dakota yet at an infamous Idaho prison.
24	14	"Old Hospital On College Hill"	Williamson, West Virginia	December 19, 2020	0.33
Dakota has saved the best for last as the team rolls up to an abandoned West Virginia hospital. Known for its brutal deaths and grisly amputations, the blood-stained grounds have a chilling prescription in store for them that may shatter the team forever.

=== Season 3 (2021) ===
No. overall	No. in season	Title	Location	Original release date	U.S. viewers (millions)
25	1	"Waverly Hills Sanatorium"	Louisville, Kentucky	July 24, 2021	0.42
The team is back, and their first stop is straight out of a nightmare. They've feared Waverly Hills Sanatorium their entire lives, and for good reason. What they catch on video lives up to its reputation.
26	2	"Missouri State Penitentiary"	Jefferson City, Missouri	July 31, 2021	0.38
Dakota blindsides the team when he decides to amp up the fear at what once was the bloodiest prison in America. Chelsea can barely hold it together when the ghost of a child kidnapper won't stop trying to communicate with her.
27	3	"Fort Knox"	Prospect, Maine	August 7, 2021	0.38
The team is left with less-than-warm feelings for Dakota when he hatches a chilling plan to communicate with the dead at an abandoned fort in Maine. Things get even more heated when a ghostly caretaker threatens to throw them all out.
28	4	"Ohio State Reformatory"	Mansfield, Ohio	August 14, 2021	0.44
All bets are off when Tanner picks one of America's most depraved prisons to investigate. He unveils a fear experiment so diabolical that the team is forced to decide whether to part ways or continue on this road trip from hell together.
29	5	"Greene County Almshouse"	Waynesburg, Pennsylvania	August 21, 2021	0.41
Fed up with Tanner's and Dakota's experiments, Chelsea picks a revenge location unlike any other. The dark, untapped energy of this Pennsylvania poorhouse is overwhelming, and forces them to make a stunning decision to save their sanity.
30	6	"Odd Fellows Home"	Liberty, Missouri	August 28, 2021	0.46
Hellbent on revenge, long-suffering Alex takes the team a decaying 240-acre compound that once housed a mysterious secret society. His diabolical plan quickly turns to regret once he realizes he has unleashed pure evil on his friends.
31	7	"Edinburgh Manor"	Scotch Grove, Iowa	September 4, 2021	0.48
Six years ago, Dakota and Alex foolishly attempted to investigate a haunted husk of a building buried deep in the cornfields of Iowa. Now, armed with experience and a team, they've returned to turn the tables on a vengeful poltergeist known as The Joker.
32	8	"Villisca Axe Murder House"	Villisca, Iowa	September 11, 2021	0.42
Dakota doubles down in Iowa for a huge finish to a hellish road trip. In an unprecedented move, he takes the team to two terrifying locations at the same time to investigate one of America's most gruesome cold cases, the Villisca axe murders.
33	9	"Twin Bridges Orphanage"	Twin Bridges, Montana	November 6, 2021	0.33
The team finds themselves blinded by terror in an abandoned orphanage. When Dakota attempts to tap into the dark energy that permeates the facility, he heaps fear upon the team and communicates with something that may not be what it seems.
34	10	"Old Nazareth Hospital"	Mineral Wells, Texas	November 13, 2021	0.42
The team investigates one of the most haunted hospitals in America. Chelsea is unhappy to discover a haunted doll room on the premises, and the team is not prepared when a wave of pent-up paranormal energy is unleashed upon them.
35	11	"Phelps Dodge Hospital"	Ajo, Arizona	November 20, 2021	0.40
The team digs deep as they mine their darkest fears at an abandoned Arizona hospital. Faced with a vicious entity that hates men, they get more evidence than they dared hope for, when one of them gets a ghostly death threat.
36	12	"Nevada State Prison"	Carson City, Nevada	November 27, 2021	0.37
Still reeling from a ghostly warning, Dakota and the team heads to one of America's deadliest prisons, a place packed with tortured entities. True fear strikes their hearts when a spirit reaches out to the team for an unimaginable request.
37	13	"Old Adrian Hospital"	Punxsutawney, Pennsylvania	December 4, 2021	0.41
It's Tanner's turn to pick, and his plans for revenge take a dark turn at a deserted Pennsylvania hospital. Dark entities, doppelgangers and poltergeists lurk around every corner, but what the team hears is the most terrifying of all.
38	14	"Indiana State Sanatorium"	Rockville, Indiana	December 11, 2021	0.44
Alex pushes new fear boundaries with his pick. Not only has the Indiana State Sanatorium never been explored, nobody in the world knows what lurks within its walls. This investigation will challenge the team unlike any other before it.
39	15	"Loftus Hall"	Hook Head, County Wexford, Ireland	December 18, 2021	0.41
The team jumps out of their comfort zone and across the pond to the rugged and stormy coast of Ireland. They're prepared to come face-to-face with poltergeists, ghostly nuns and maybe the Devil himself at a cursed 14th-century mansion.
40	16	"Spike Island"	Cork Harbour, Ireland	December 25, 2021	0.39
The team's epic overseas investigation takes them to Ireland's most haunted prison. The dark forces on the island are overwhelming, and terror hits Tanner like a ton of bricks and lights up Dakota with a fear he's never experienced before.

=== Season 4 (2022–23) ===
No. overall	No. in season	Title	Location	Original release date	U.S. viewers (millions)
41	1	"Cresson Sanatorium and Prison, Part One"	Lilly, Pennsylvania	November 25, 2022	0.22
The team finally returns to face a trifecta of terror at a decaying sanatorium in rural Pennsylvania. If a ghostly mimic and child spirits aren't enough to shake up the crew, Dakota Laden has a dark and twisted experiment up his sleeve to amp up the fear at this foreboding facility.
42	2	"Cresson Sanatorium and Prison, Part Two"	Lilly, Pennsylvania	December 2, 2022	0.25
Dakota Laden's diabolical dive into darkness continues when he blindsides the team with a double dose of terror at an abandoned Pennsylvania sanatorium. Can they handle a night in the cell block where one of America's most horrific serial killers was housed?
43	3	"Defiance Jr. High School"	Defiance, Ohio	December 9, 2022	0.25
The team learns the true meaning of "school spirit" at a vacant junior high school in Ohio. From jangling keys luring them to a killer custodian's lair to a mind-boggling encounter in the gym, Dakota Laden and crew are the victims of a non-stop haunted hazing.
43	4	"Old Historic Harriman Hospital"	Harriman, Tennessee	December 16, 2022	0.30
Tanner Wiseman may have found the G.O.A.T. of all haunted locations when he picks out a deserted Tennessee hospital for the next stop. Rumors of bizarre hauntings swirl around this eerie, unexplored facility, but nobody can explain why. Can the team unlock its disturbing secrets?
45	5	"Winchester Mystery House"	San Jose, California	December 23, 2022	0.31
Chelsea Laden pulls the team out of the darkness and into the California sunshine ... but only for a minute as she plunges them into the haunted madness of a legendary mansion. The crew takes a shot in the dark to see what energy is at play behind its walls.
46	6	"Ashmore Estates"	Ashmore, Illinois	December 30, 2022	0.33
Alex Schroeder has a big surprise in store for Dakota Laden, Chelsea Laden and Tanner Wiseman when he takes them back to a decrepit Illinois poorhouse so scary that they swore never to return. But will tragic new information about this location force the team to re-evaluate the haunting?
47	7	"Mid-Orange Correctional Facility"	Warwick, New York	January 6, 2023	0.26
The team falls deeper into the darkness at a deteriorating juvenile detention center near a quiet New York village. Dakota Laden is eager to establish a close bond with the youthful spirits, but quickly discovers to be careful what you wish for in this nightmarish facility.
48	8	"Norwich State Hospital"	Preston, Connecticut	January 13, 2023	0.23
Dakota Laden saves the darkest, bleakest location for the last stop of one twisted road trip. This infamous psychiatric hospital in rural Connecticut is so diseased with dark history and demonic energy that it may be the final nail in the coffin for the "Destination Fear" team.

== See also ==
- Ghost hunting
- Paranormal television
- Haunted locations in the United States
- Ghost Adventures
