= Chelsea Laden =

American former ice hockey player

- Born: September 12, 1992 (age 34) Lakeville, Minnesota, United States
- Height: 5 ft 8 in (173 cm)
- Weight: 150 lb (68 kg; 10 st 10 lb)
- Position: Goaltender
- Caught: Left
- Played for: Lakeville South High (2009–2011); Quinnipiac Bobcats (2011–2015); Connecticut Whale (2015–2016); New York Riveters (2015–2016)
- Playing career: 2011–2016

Chelsea Laden (born September 12, 1992) is an American optometrist, paranormal investigator, television creator and retired ice hockey goaltender, who played with the Connecticut Whale and New York Riveters of the Premier Hockey Federation (PHF).

== Early life and education ==
Laden was born on September 12, 1992, in Lakeville, Minnesota to Rob and Polly Laden. She has four siblings, an older sister Mykenna, and younger siblings Dakota, Tavian, and Isabella.

She has a bachelor's degree in pre-medical sciences from Quinnipiac University and a Doctor of Optometry degree from Illinois College of Optometry.

== Playing career ==
During her teenage years, she played ice hockey for Lakeville South High School in Lakeville, Minnesota, serving as team captain twice and earning all-state MVP honours four times.

From 2011 to 2015, she played NCAA Division I women's ice hockey with the Quinnipiac Bobcats of ECAC Hockey, serving as the starting goaltender of the women's hockey programme in her junior and senior seasons. As a freshman, she was named ECAC Hockey Rookie of the Week for the week of November 29, 2011, and notched her first career collegiate shutout in a 3–0 victory over Syracuse in January 2012. She was named ECAC Hockey Goaltender of the Month in October 2013 and was a three-time ECAC Hockey All-Academic Team selection.

After graduating from Quinnipiac, she was ready to end her ice hockey career due to a lack of viable opportunities in the sport. However, when the PHF (then NWHL) was founded that summer by Dani Rylan, she was able to sign her first professional contract, worth $14,000, with the Connecticut Whale. She made her PHF debut in late October 2015, backstopping four third-period penalty kills in a victory over the Buffalo Beauts, the first away victory in Whale franchise history. She then missed several months of the season dealing with a finger injury. In February 2016, she became part of the first-ever trade in PHF history, being traded to the New York Riveters in exchange for Shenae Lundberg.

== Filmography ==
In 2019, she began starring in a Travel Channel original paranormal television show called Destination Fear along with her brother, Dakota Laden, and friends Tanner Wiseman and Alex Schroeder. The show follows the group of self-proclaimed 'paranormal explorers' as they travel to reportedly haunted, paranormal hotspots across the United States at which the team separates and sleeps alone at the end of each night and records their experiences. The Ladens and Wiseman had previously produced a similarly themed documentary called Trail to Terror in 2016. The documentary was shown in Theatres at Mall of America in Bloomington, Minnesota on October 29, 2016.

=== Television ===
Year(s)	Title	Role	Notes
2015	Sports Paws	Guest	Q30 Television
2016	Trail to Terror	Herself	Crew member
2019–2023	Destination Fear	Herself	Crew member
2019	The Kelly Clarkson Show	Guest	With Dakota Laden
2020	The Jason Show	Guest	With Dakota Laden
2020	Darkness Radio Minnesota - Paranormal Talk Radio	Guest	With Dakota Laden
2020	Up Close and Paranormal	Guest	With Destination Fear
2020	Rich Sports Talk: From Hockey to Haunts	Guest	
2020	Shock Docs: This is Halloween	Herself	With Destination Fear
2020	Paranormal Pastime: Optometry student explores haunted places for Travel Channel show	Herself	WCTV
2021	Comic-Con: Wonder Women - Superstars of Paranormal	Guest panellist	With Amy Bruni; Katrina Weidman; Cindy Kaza
2021	Comic-Con: Tales From Route 666	Guest panellist	With Destination Fear
2021	The Jason Show	Guest	With Destination Fear
2021	Rich Sports Talk	Guest	Halloween special

=== Web ===
Year(s)	Title	Role	Notes
2023–present	Project Fear	Herself	https://www.youtube.com/@FearProject

== Personal life ==
Laden is married to Jake Rancic who she met while they were both studying at Illinois College of Optometry.
