= Nopeming Sanatorium =

Geography
- Location: Duluth, Minnesota, US

History
- Opened: 22 May 1912
- Closed: 27 November 2002

Nopeming Sanatorium is a former tuberculosis hospital and later nursing home located in Midway Township outside of Duluth, Minnesota, United States. Nopeming roughly translates to "out in the woods" in the Ojibwe language.

From 1957 to 1971, Nopeming operated both as a sanatorium and a nursing home for the elderly. In December 1971, it officially became the Nopeming Nursing Home. Funding issues and operating costs resulted in the facility's closure in 2002. The main building still exists, unoccupied and closed to the public.

== History ==
Nopeming Sanatorium was the first of 13 county facilities to open under Minnesota's 1909 sanatorium law, opening its doors to the public on May 22, 1912. Located near Duluth, it served the state's largest county, St. Louis, which includes portions of the Iron Range. At the time, one person was dying from tuberculosis every other day in St. Louis County alone.

The sanatorium was first called the St. Louis County Hospital. However, since patients were expected to pay a fixed portion of maintenance costs during their stay, the founders of the sanatorium wanted to avoid a name that would suggest patients were public or county charges. Rev. Frank Piquette, a missionary to the Chippewa tribe in Sawyer, Minnesota, first suggested the name "Nopeming," which roughly translates to "out in the woods" in the Ojibwe language.

The first superintendent was Dr. Arthur T. Laird, who had previously studied at Trudeau Sanatorium in Saranac Lake, New York, where the sanatorium treatment for tuberculosis first originated. Dr. Laird remained at Nopeming until 1943 and was the facility's longest-serving superintendent.

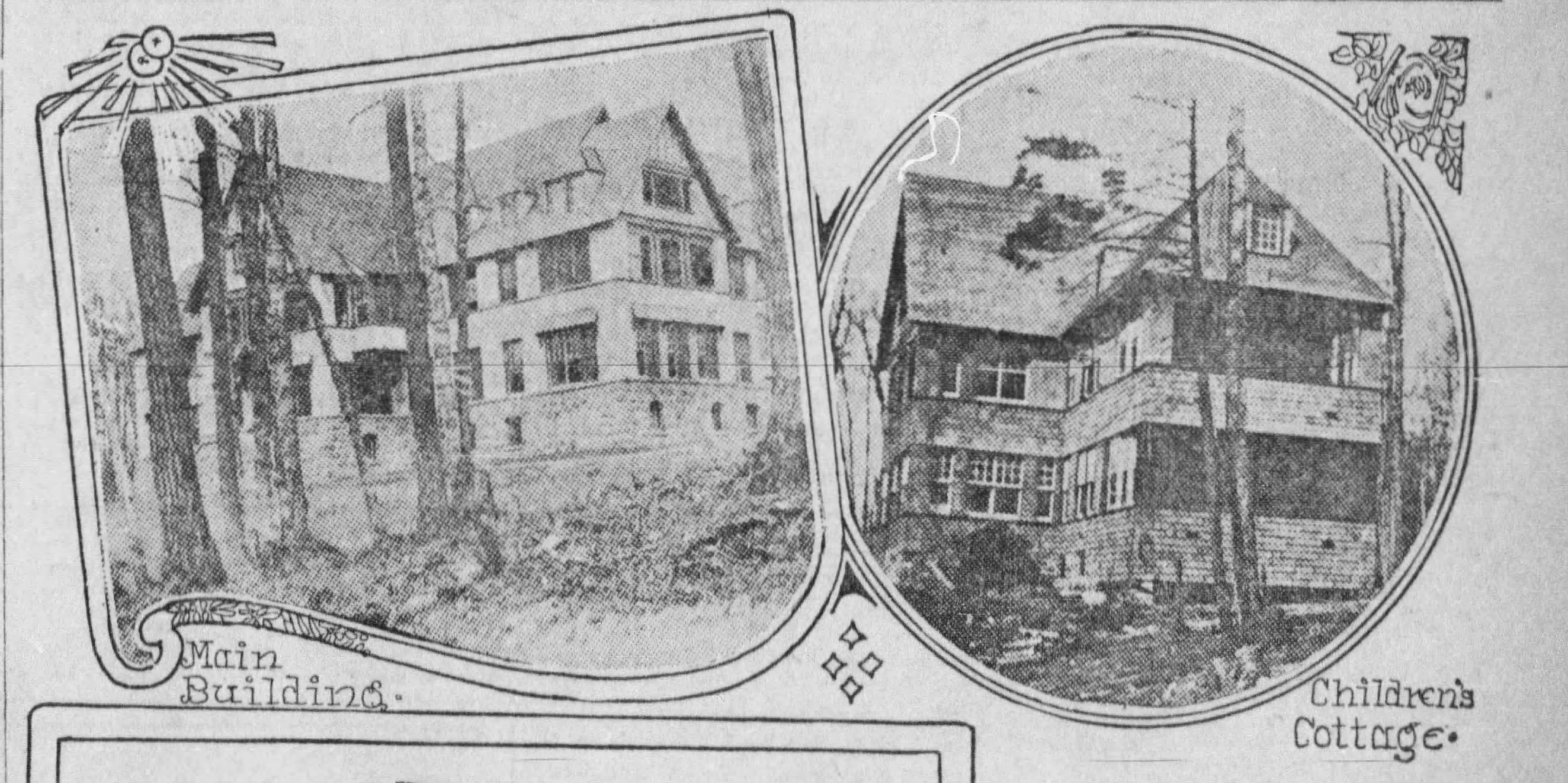
Photos of the main building and children's cottage at Nopeming Sanatorium. Published in The Star Tribune (Minneapolis) on July 6, 1913

In its early days, Nopeming started off as two large cottages, one for adults and one for children, providing traditional fresh air treatment. Initial capacity was 30 beds, but quickly expanded to 50. Eventually, larger buildings were added to the grounds for a more hospital-like treatment setting, increasing patient capacity to 300. The grounds also included quarters for those who worked at the sanatorium, as well as a crematorium in later years.

The sanatorium eventually became not only a place for treatment, but also one of education, socialization and community. Patients were given educational work to complete as soon as they were cleared to do so by a physician, and many completed school or college courses before leaving Nopeming. Besides regular grade school and high school instruction, the hospital also offered a night school in typewriting and shorthand.

In May 1940, a murder-suicide occurred inside the hospital. During a largely-attended celebration for Mother's Day and National Hospital Day, a man named John Wintoniak confronted a Nopeming orderly named Alex Sufruk over money. Wintoniak shot Sufruk several times before turning the gun on himself. Sufruk died from his injuries an hour after the confrontation.

As medications for tuberculosis became available, the need for the sanatorium diminished. The transition to nursing home care began in 1957, when the Trudeau Building on Nopeming campus was renovated into a 42-bed nursing home for chronically ill patients. In 1971, the facility officially became a nursing home for the elderly, known as Nopeming Nursing Home.

In 2002, the county decided to close the nursing home, transferring all patients to other facilities in the area. The official closing date was November 27, 2002. Over the course of the building's history, approximately 1,500 people died inside Nopeming.

== Recent years ==
The property was purchased in 2005 for $1,050,000 by Twin Cities businessman Frank Vennes Jr.. Vennes donated 40 acres of the property, including the buildings, to Fidelis Foundation of Plymouth, Minnesota, in hopes of eventually turning the building into a facility for troubled youth. However, Vennes was arrested in 2009 due to his involvement in a Ponzi scheme. Unable to follow through with plans due to Vennes having been their main investor, Fidelis donated the property to nonprofit Orison, Inc. in December 2009. They began offering tours in October 2016 to try and raise money for restoration costs.

The crew of Ghost Adventures visited Nopeming in 2015 for their tenth season, marking the first official televised investigation. Destination Fear opened their second season in 2020 with their own paranormal investigation.

Public tours continued until 2019, when the county shut them down due to fire code violations. Since then, Nopeming has sat abandoned and closed to the public, decaying due to weather and vandalism.
