= Ryan Buell =

American paranormal investigator (born 1982)

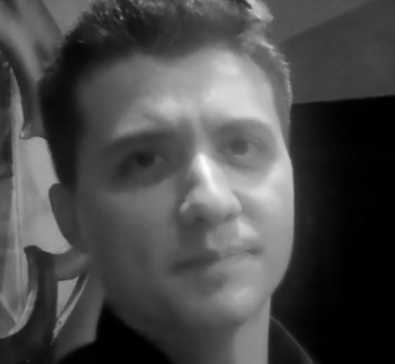
- Buell during a 2011 interview
- Born: Ryan Daniel Buell; July 8, 1982 (age 44); Corry, Pennsylvania, U.S.
- Education: Pennsylvania State University
- Occupations: Paranormal investigator, author and producer
- Organization(s): Paranormal Research Society, founder
- Television: Paranormal State, host

Ryan Daniel Buell (born July 8, 1982) is an American paranormal investigator, author and producer who was the main host of the TV show Paranormal State.

== Early life and education ==
Buell was born July 8, 1982 in Corry, Pennsylvania, and raised in Sumter, South Carolina. He earned bachelor degrees in journalism and anthropology from Pennsylvania State University in State College, Pennsylvania.

== Career ==
Buell was the main host of the TV A&E show Paranormal State. He was the executive producer for the feature film American Ghost Hunter, released in 2010. In 2011, Buell and partner Chad Calek announced a 41-city tour for the film. In 2010, Buell served as Co-Executive Producer for Paranormal State and for The Ghost Prophecies, of which he is also the co-creator. Buell and his team decided against continuing Paranormal State after the fifth season to pursue other things. Their final episode aired Monday, May 2, 2011.

In 2023, Buell received a master's degree in Counselor Education, with a concentration in clinical mental health, from University of South Carolina. In pursuit of this degree, he learned the skills to conduct individual and group counseling sessions, which he got to use while interning at a private practice. Of this experience, he says: “I literally found my purpose in this program and I feel like I grew as a human being. There are a lot of kids who are struggling so I really want to work with kids especially with ADHD, LGBTQ+ populations, addicts and trauma survivors.”

Buell is expected to begin working as a licensed professional counselor associate in September 2023 in San Antonio, Texas.

== Personal life ==
Buell's memoir, Paranormal State: My Journey into the Unknown, was released in September 2010. Among other subjects, Buell discusses his bisexuality and his struggle to reconcile his sexual orientation with Catholicism, the faith with which he was raised. "I've decided to share my sexuality and struggle over faith in hopes that others will no longer feel as though they are alone or that they can't be religious."

During and after the filming of Paranormal State, Buell struggled with various drug addictions. Recovering from these addictions and attending therapy led him to return to school to become a therapist. In 2018 he took counseling courses at the University of South Carolina College of Education, and ultimately graduated with a master's degree in Counselor Education in 2023.

“The counseling program is all about helping people empower themselves and promote change from within,” Buell says. “If I can help promote change or be a positive force for a few people and then they are a positive force for a few people, that's a big ripple effect.”

== Controversies ==
In July 2012, Buell claimed he had been diagnosed with pancreatic cancer. In late 2013, Buell told People magazine that he was near remission. However, his mother, Shelly Bonavita Lundburg, later denied his cancer diagnosis.

In July 2014, Buell began selling tickets for a "Conversations with the Dead Tour." These shows, however, were indefinitely postponed, and many of the customers did not receive refunds or further correspondence on the status of the shows. Buell's friend and collaborator on Paranormal State, Chip Coffey, claimed that the ticket sales had exceeded $80,000, and that while he had been in charge of helping plan the shows, he learned that Buell had not actually booked any of them.

Buell was arrested on September 18, 2016 in Florence County, South Carolina on a warrant from State College, Pennsylvania. He was extradited back to Pennsylvania and charged with two third-degree felonies for theft of leased property and receiving stolen property, and one misdemeanor for theft of services. He was released on bail from Centre County Corrections Facility on October 18 after spending 30 days in jail.

Buell was subsequently arrested on April 21, 2017 on charges of simple assault and harassment of his boyfriend. In July 2017, after his releases from jail and rehabilitation, Buell published a personal blog post where he apologized to his fans, admitted he was a recovering drug addict and had recently been discharged from rehabilitation.

== Recovery & Post-Addiction ==
After his arrests and time in rehab, Buell has regularly spoken about his drug use and recovery. In his live feeds, Buell admitted that he struggled with drug addiction for years, using opiates, heroin and methamphetamine. He claims that his recovery date is "April 21, 2017," the same date as his second arrest.

In a 2024 interview, Buell stated that he suffered from severe depression and anxiety while filming "Paranormal State," and that he wasn't prepared for the fame and notoriety that came with having a hit TV show. Additionally, Buell also shared that he struggled with accepting his sexual identity.

In the same interview, Buell shared that he is now a licensed professional therapist and hopes to help people with addiction, as well as using therapy to help people who have paranormal experiences.

Buell has stated that he is open to returning to TV one day. He currently offers speaking events across the United States, and he recently opened a telehealth therapy practice that focuses on helping people with paranormal experiences.
