= Paranormal State =

American paranormal reality television series

- Genre: Paranormal; Docudrama; Reality
- Starring: Ryan Buell; Heather Taddy; Sergey Poberezhny; Katrina Weidman; Josh Light; Eilfie Music; Michelle Belanger
- Country of origin: United States
- Original language: English
- No. of seasons: 6
- No. of episodes: 93 (+ 1 special) (list of episodes)

Production
- Camera setup: Multiple
- Running time: 22 minutes
- Production companies: Four Seasons Productions; Go Go Luckey Productions; Picture Shack Entertainment

Original release
- Network: A&E Network
- Release: December 10, 2007 – May 2, 2011

Related
- Paranormal Lockdown

Paranormal State is an American paranormal reality television series that premiered on the A&E Network on December 10, 2007. The program follows and stars the Pennsylvania State University Paranormal Research Society, a student-led college club. The show features the group's investigations of alleged paranormal phenomena at reportedly haunted locations.

== Production ==
The show was produced by Four Seasons Productions International and Go Go Luckey Productions (which produced MTV's Laguna Beach: The Real Orange County and Newport Harbor: The Real Orange County, and A&E's now-cancelled Rollergirls). Gary Auerbach and Julie Auerbach (who head Go Go Luckey Productions) and Betsy Schechter (Four Seasons) were the executive producers. The show was tentatively titled "Out There", "Dead Time" and "Paranormal U" before being called "Paranormal State."

Every episode of the show was outlined by the production team first, co-executive producer Tina Gazzerro stated, to ensure that a producible episode will result. "We try to identify where we get our discovery moments, our 'Ah-ha!' moments", Gazzerro told the Pittsburgh Post-Gazette. Information about the event under investigation may also be held back from the students in order to create dramatic tension, and only situations which will have a conclusive outcome are investigated. "We may have information we don't give to [the PRS team]", Gazzerro said, "but we need to make sure [the episode is] produceable." Story arcs were also outlined for each "character" on the show, and the production team had publicly expressed its hope that a romantic relationship would develop between the research team leader Ryan Buell and one of the women on the series. The production team and the show's researchers say that no pressure was put on the research team to act in certain ways or make paranormal discoveries.

A&E had high hopes for the new series. Cable television reality shows about the paranormal require only about a quarter of the budget of a scripted show of the same length. They also draw much-coveted younger viewers, and lean slightly more female than male (a difficult demographic to draw for most cable networks not explicitly targeting women)

Fourteen half-hour episodes were ordered for the first season. A&E upped that order to 20 shows after seeing the pilot and the first few episodes. Had the show not been picked up by A&E, Buell said he had another series deal in the works with the Auerbachs and their production company. The show was initially scheduled to debut in May or June 2007, but was pushed back to December 2007 for undisclosed reasons.

The show debuted on December 10, 2007, with 2.5 million viewers watching the first two back-to-back episodes, making it the third-most watched show on A&E since 2004. The cable network reported that this included 1.6 million people aged 18 to 49 (a highly coveted demographic by broadcasters and advertisers). It also included 1.5 million viewers in the 25-to-54 age range, A&E's target demographic.

The show's second season began on July 28, 2008 on A&E; its third season, on January 19, 2009, the fourth season on December 15, 2009 on A&E, and the DVD release for this season for September 28, 2010. On May 4, 2010, A&E confirmed that Paranormal State was renewed for a fifth season for a total of 20 episodes. On July 27, 2010, A&E Home Video released a 2-DVD set featuring 12 episodes from season two entitled Paranormal State: The Complete Season Two. A special entitled Paranormal State: The New Class aired on November 21, 2010, it featured members of Hoosier State Paranormal. On January 6, 2011, Buell revealed that the series would be ending.

== Reception ==
Most critics who enjoy the show credit it for being "spooky". In a typical comment, one reviewer said the show was "...the perfect blend of bump-in-the-night scariness and cinéma vérité. It's 'The Blair Witch Project' meets 'Unsolved Mysteries.' But if you scare easily, don't watch this show alone."

Reviewers have pointed out that the show effectively utilizes a number of cinematic techniques common in horror film. The editing leaves open the question of whether paranormal activity is actually occurring, and the cinematography uses night-vision and infrared photography to create a suspenseful atmosphere. The writing on the show is particularly effective at creating a sense of portent and dread, one reviewer noted, and the music and graphics contribute effectively to the tension and fear as well.

At least one critic has pointed out that the investigatory team's failure to definitively find paranormal activity in each episode gives the show credibility over other series about the paranormal lack.

Conversely, the Orange County Register gave it a "dishonorable mention" as one of the worst new shows of the 2007-2008 television season. The New York Times critic Neil Genzlinger faulted the series for being too low-budget and not frightening enough (a The Blair Witch Project minus the fright).

Some reviewers have strongly criticized the high production values which others praise. As one otherwise positive review noted, "The biggest drawback to the series is that it's over-produced, with too many eerie sounds and visual effects. Is the heavy breathing something picked up by PRS microphones, or is it a sound effect added after the fact by the show's producers?"

Critics have also pointed out that the show lacks visual punch. People interviewed in the show declare that they "feel" a spirit next to them, but nothing is shown to the TV viewer. In the series debut, the audience is told that a young boy sees ghosts, but the audience is not able to see any evidence of this. "The most compelling footage seems to come more from the editing room than beyond the grave", noted one industry trade publication. Reviewers say the show also fails to effectively integrate and utilize the team's (apparently) sophisticated audio and video equipment to heighten tension or help support their claims of paranormal activity.

Others have noted that the show's stars are not particularly good performers or presenters. Buell and the changing cast of supporting "paranormal trainees", psychologists, counselors and psychics seem inexperienced and are ineffectual at creating a sense of fear or suspense. "Buell looks self-conscious and sounds like he is reading from cue cards", one critic wrote. "The remaining three members of the core team ... don't seem confident or mature enough to take on a crabby Starbucks' manager, much less a demonic presence."

== Release ==
=== Marketing ===
In November 2007, a six-story billboard was erected at the corner of Prince and Mulberry Streets in New York City. Behind the billboard were two directional audio (or audioSpotlights) which produce a highly focused beam of sound. Passers-by who walked directly in the path of the sound would hear spooky, disembodied voices whispering suggestive messages such as "What's that?" and "Who's there? It's not your imagination." But someone standing next to that person would hear nothing. The billboard had a dramatic effect on people coming within range of the "cone of sound" created by the directional audio speakers. The billboard was apparently the first commercial use of the technology on a billboard.

== See also ==
- List of ghost films
