= Sheboygan County Asylum =

Former lunatic asylum serving Sheboygan County, Wisconsin

Coordinates: 43°45′31.0″N 87°44′13.9″W

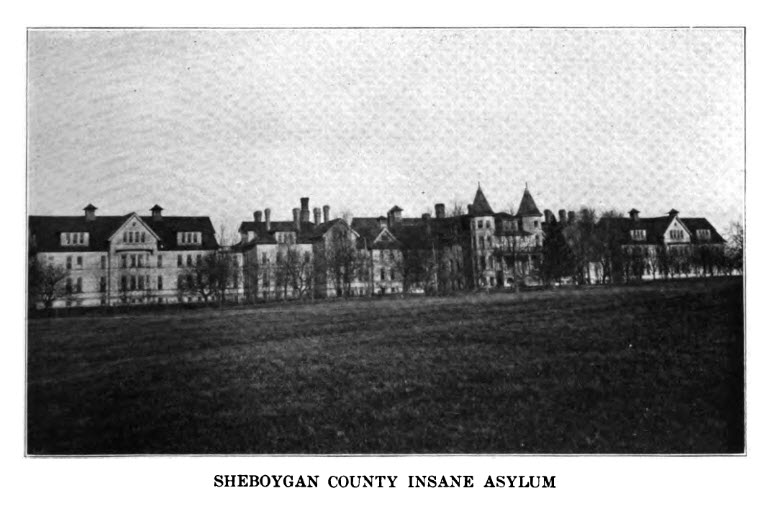
Sheboygan County Asylum in Sheboygan, c. 1912

The Sheboygan County Hospital for the Insane was a former care facility serving Sheboygan County, Wisconsin. Opened in 1876 in Winooski, it was replaced in 1882 with a larger facility in Sheboygan, which underwent several expansions before closing in 1940. It was succeeded by Sheboygan County Comprehensive Health Care Center in Sheboygan Falls, which operated from 1940 to 2002 and is reputedly haunted, in part because of confusion with the asylum.

== History ==
=== Winooski location ===
The asylum was opened in June 1876, in Winooski, to house the chronically insane who had previously been housed in the state hospital and the jail. On February 19, 1878, four of 21 inmates, one of whom was mentally disabled, died in a fire that destroyed the building.

=== Sheboygan location ===
The Winooski building was soon rebuilt, but was replaced with a larger building on a site between Superior and Erie Avenues in Sheboygan, built under an 1881 state law that provided funds for the care of the insane in county asylums, which opened in June 1882. This was called the county hospital, but became known as the asylum. It also served as a poorhouse. An addition the following year increased the building's capacity from 40 to 90. Another fire, on December 29, 1892, claimed the life of the night watchman who discovered it. The asylum farmed its land to feed and employ the inmates; by 1911, after further expansions and the acquisition of an adjacent farm through a bond issue, it stood on 309 acres and had a capacity of 225 inmates.

The facility closed in 1940, having become dilapidated, and was demolished in 1960. Pick 'n Save (formerly Park & Save) and Advocate Aurora Health Center (founded as the Sheboygan Clinic) were built in 1983 and 1985, respectively (with Pick 'n Save rebuilt in 2010) on the former asylum plot.

== Sheboygan Falls medical center ==
Sheboygan County Comprehensive Health Care Center was built in 1940 at N3773 Garden Parkway in Sheboygan Falls, and was a nursing home for the elderly as well as housing the mentally ill and people with developmental disabilities. During World War II, it was requisitioned by the US military and from 1944 to the end of 1945, as Camp Sheboygan, housed German and Italian prisoners of war who had been moved from the United Kingdom as a security risk. They worked on local farms and in factories on a voluntary basis.

In 1969, the center became an acute care facility for the mentally ill, and until 1975 it also offered alcohol and drug rehabilitation. In 1978 it was converted into a residential center for people with developmental disabilities and chronic illnesses.

Starting in 1988, these forms of residential care were phased out in Wisconsin, and the center closed in 2002.

The medical center building covers 2752 square feet. A system of tunnels runs underneath it.

=== Rumored haunting ===
The empty medical center building has attracted urban explorers and stories that it is haunted, partly because it is confused with the asylum. Rumors that the building is haunted and that nurses committed suicide were explored in episode six of the second season of the Travel Channel show Destination Fear.

The vacant Sheboygan County Comprehensive Health Care Center in 2008
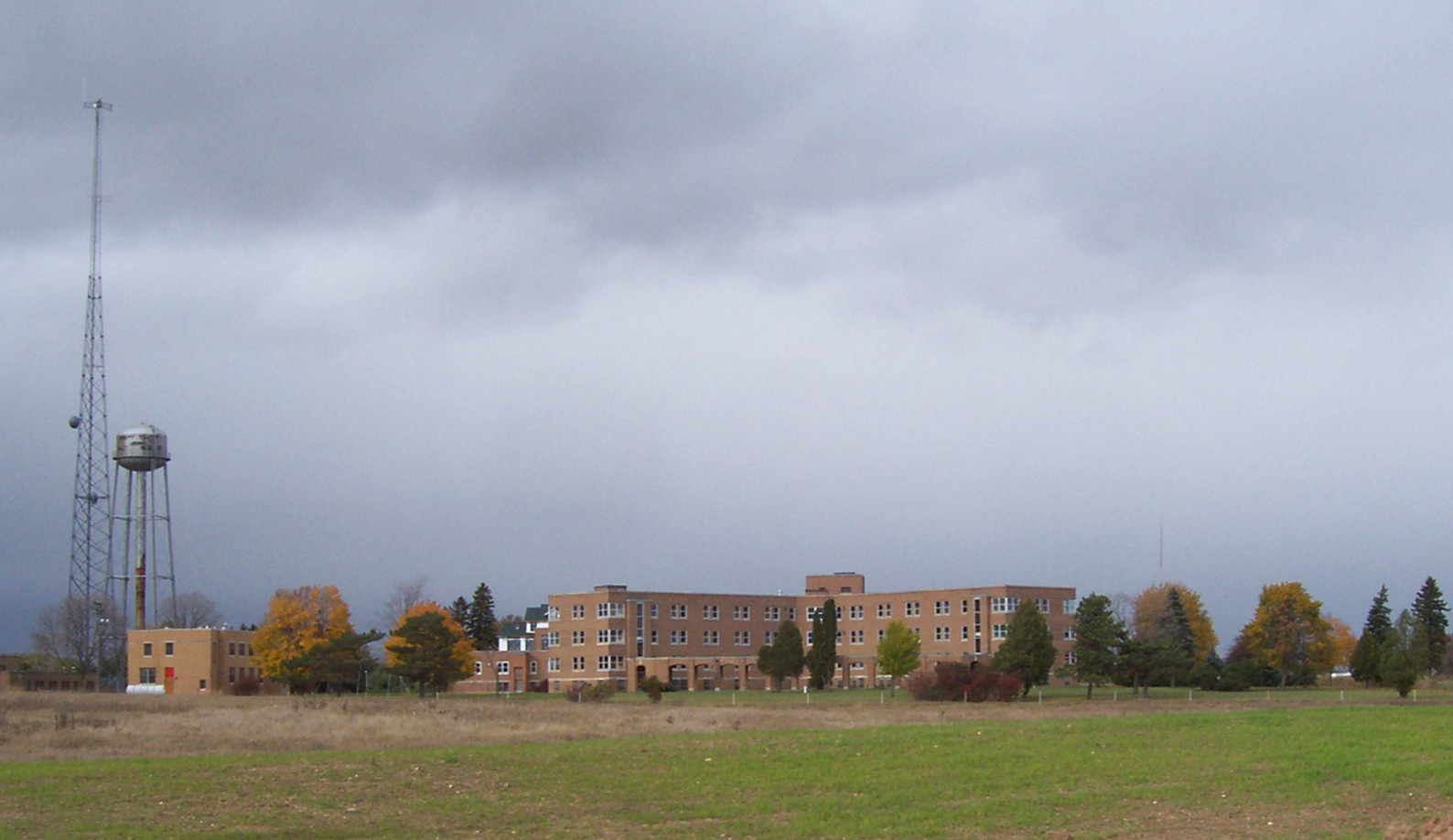
West side

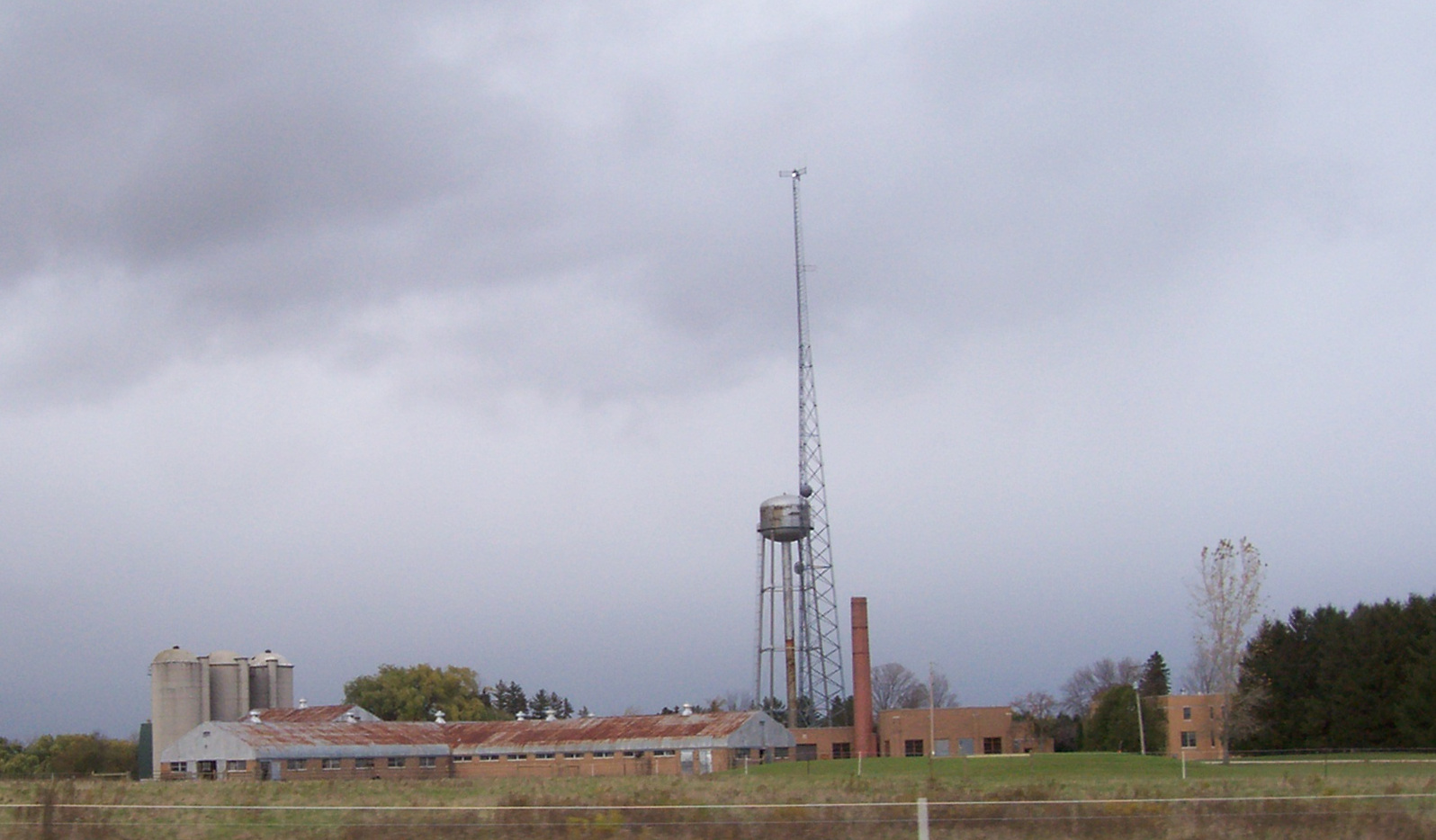
East side
