= Saratoga County Homestead =

Tuberculosis sanatorium in New York state

Coordinates: 43°06′12.14″N 74°01′15.32″W

The Saratoga County Homestead, or Homestead Sanitarium, was a large tuberculosis sanatorium located in the hamlet of Barkersville, [Also known as East Galway] in Providence, New York. It is publicly recorded as The Homestead Sanitarium and located on County Highway 16.

The Homestead was opened in 1914 and treated patients for tuberculosis until 1960. The original building was wood, but was replaced by the brick building that stands today, in 1932. The institution reopened in 1961 as The Saratoga County Infirmary.

Some visitors of the building point to the things left behind — beds, books, kitchen supplies, medical supplies, etc. — as evidence of the facility being shut down suddenly. However, if this was in fact reopened as the Saratoga County Infirmary, then the left behind items would not be related to the sanitarium.

Saratoga County officials sold the building in the 1980s to Bruce Houran, who was planning to reopen it as healthcare related facility. The building remains vacant, but still stands.

Thrill seekers have often traveled to this building in the hopes of capturing some ghost activity.

It has been sold to Patrick Brereton of Saratoga Springs, New York.

The Homestead was sold via tax auction in September 2019 to current owner, James Walk from Corinth, Texas. The Homestead is set to undergo renovations and James is working with a local contact to start scheduling photography tours and will eventually open access to most parts of the hospital. The caretakers house is scheduled as the first stage in the rehab for the entire property. Plans for the property include creating a retreat for veterans, adding some local business, creation of agricultural training course and outdoor gardens along with a living museum of the sites history as a tuberculosis hospital.
