= Chip Coffey =

Self-proclaimed psychic and medium

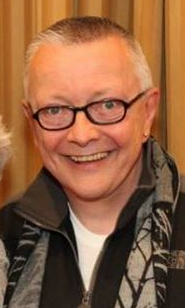
- Coffey in 2014
- Born: August 21, 1954 (age 71); Elmira, New York, U.S.
- Occupation: Medium
- Known for: Paranormal State, Kindred Spirits, Psychic Kids

Chip Coffey (born August 21, 1954) is an American self-proclaimed psychic from Elmira, New York, currently living in Atlanta, Georgia. He appeared as a medium on various paranormal television programs, primarily Paranormal State and Psychic Kids. On Psychic Kids he acts as a mentor towards children who claim to have psychic abilities, primarily seeing ghosts. Coffey's claims of being able to communicate with the dead have been subject to criticism by skeptics. In 2019 it was announced that Coffey will be joining Travel Channel's Kindred Spirits as the third official cast member alongside Adam Berry and Amy Bruni for the fourth season in 2020.

== History ==
Coffey was born in Elmira, New York. He was raised a Roman Catholic and identifies as a Christian. Coffey spent his early life in Elmira and South Carolina. He graduated from Elmira College in 1976.

According to Coffey, when he was a child, he would tell his parents when the phone was about to ring and who was calling; referring to his ability to read the past, present and future as a "God given talent" Coffey said that when he reached adulthood, he began to see full-body apparitions. He also defines what he feels to be the difference between a ghost and a spirit: "the latter has completed the journey between the world of the living and the world of the dead. Ghosts, on the other hand, are souls that, for whatever reason, have chosen to stick around. They may not know they're dead, or they may fear judgment on the other side."

In 2019, it was announced that Coffey would be joining the main cast of Kindred Spirits for the fourth season. This comes after Coffey appeared in the Haunted Salem 2019 live special with both Berry and Bruni from Kindred Spirits.

== Criticism ==
Mediumship is considered to be pseudoscience, and Coffey specifically has been roundly criticized by scientific skeptics. In 2009, the James Randi Education Foundation awarded Coffey a Pigasus Award "For the psychic who tricked the most people with the least effort". According to skeptical investigator Joe Nickell, Coffey has been accused of hoaxing and "outright deception" involving the television series Paranormal State.

In September 2014, members of the Bay Area Skeptics attended one of Coffey's seance sessions as part of what they termed a "sting operation" intended to reveal the falsity of his psychic claims. According to Ohlone College professor Sheldon Helms, skeptics posing as fans planted stories of fictitious dead family members with Coffey's staff. According to organizer Susan Gerbic, "Coffey claimed to be clearly communicating with our nonexistent family members".

In October 2013, while appearing on the KFXN-FM morning show The Power Trip, Coffey was confronted by host Cory Cove, who voiced skepticism over Coffey's alleged psychic powers. Coffey reportedly "stormed out of the studio" following Cove's confrontation.
