= Aaron Sagers =

American journalist

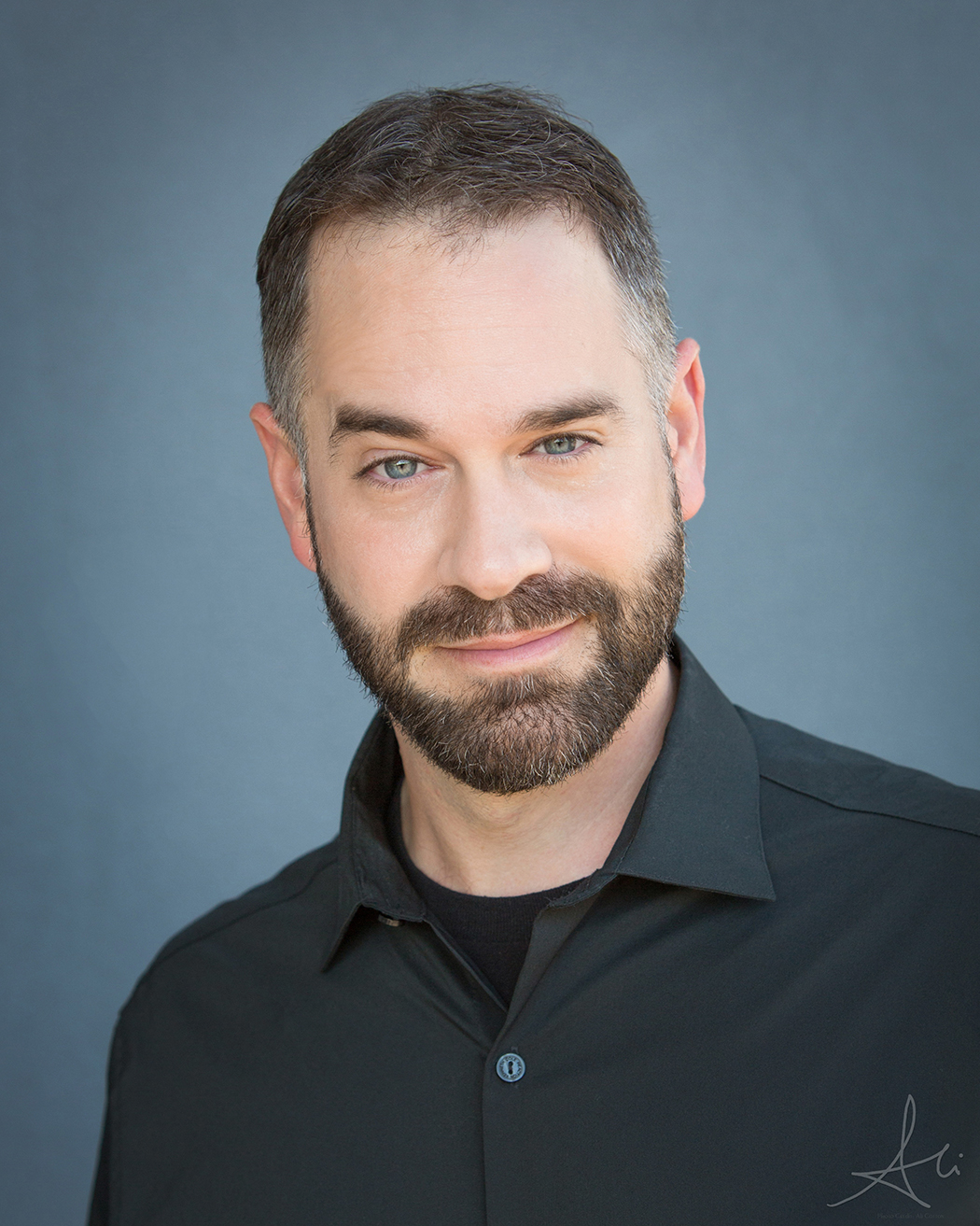
- Aaron Sagers, August 2019
- Born: November 15, 1977 (44 years old); Orlando, Florida, United States
- Education: Graduated New York University, M.A. in Journalism, 2004
- Occupations: TV presenter, entertainment journalism, online journalism, TV producer, paranormal investigator
- Years active: 2004–present
- Notable credit(s): Paranormal Caught On Camera, Paranormal Paparazzi, Talking Strange podcast, Ripley's Believe It Or Not!, The Paranormal Pop Culture Collection
- Website: Official website

Aaron Sagers is an American television presenter, journalist — including a self-described "paranormal journalist" — podcast host, and expert of geek culture and paranormal media. He is also an author, social media micro-influencer, and founder of ParanormalPopCulture.com, a website that covers paranormal topics in popular culture.

Sagers was host/co-executive producer on Travel Channel's Paranormal Paparazzi, which he co-created and co-executive produced with Zak Bagans, has appeared on The Today Show, Paranormal Lockdown, Portals to Hell, and numerous other paranormal programming.

He is the co-host of the 2022 Netflix paranormal investigative series 28 Days Haunted, and currently an on-camera personality on Paranormal Caught On Camera on the Travel Channel, and Discovery+ streaming service; is executive producer and host of the Talking Strange paranormal podcast with the Den of Geek Network; and host/producer of Ripley's Believe It or Not! Ripley's Road Trip web series.

He is a speaker on paranormal and science-fiction topics for National Geographic Channel, Syfy, and Universal, and at events such as San Diego Comic-Con, New York Comic Con, South By Southwest, and Wizard World Comic Cons.

== Early life ==
Aaron Sagers was raised in Orlando, Florida, as the youngest Catholic son of five siblings, three older brothers and one older sister. He grew up with a love of nerd culture, and is a fan of Doctor Who, Star Wars, Indiana Jones and comic books. He also developed a love of the pop culture of his parents' and his own generations, such as The Twilight Zone.

Sagers attended Saint Margaret Mary school in Winter Park Florida before graduating to Bishop Moore High School. He then transferred to Tift County High School in Tifton, Georgia, before attending Flagler College in St. Augustine, Florida for his undergraduate degree. In 2002 he attended New York University to study journalism for his Master of Arts, where he graduated in 2004.

== Career ==
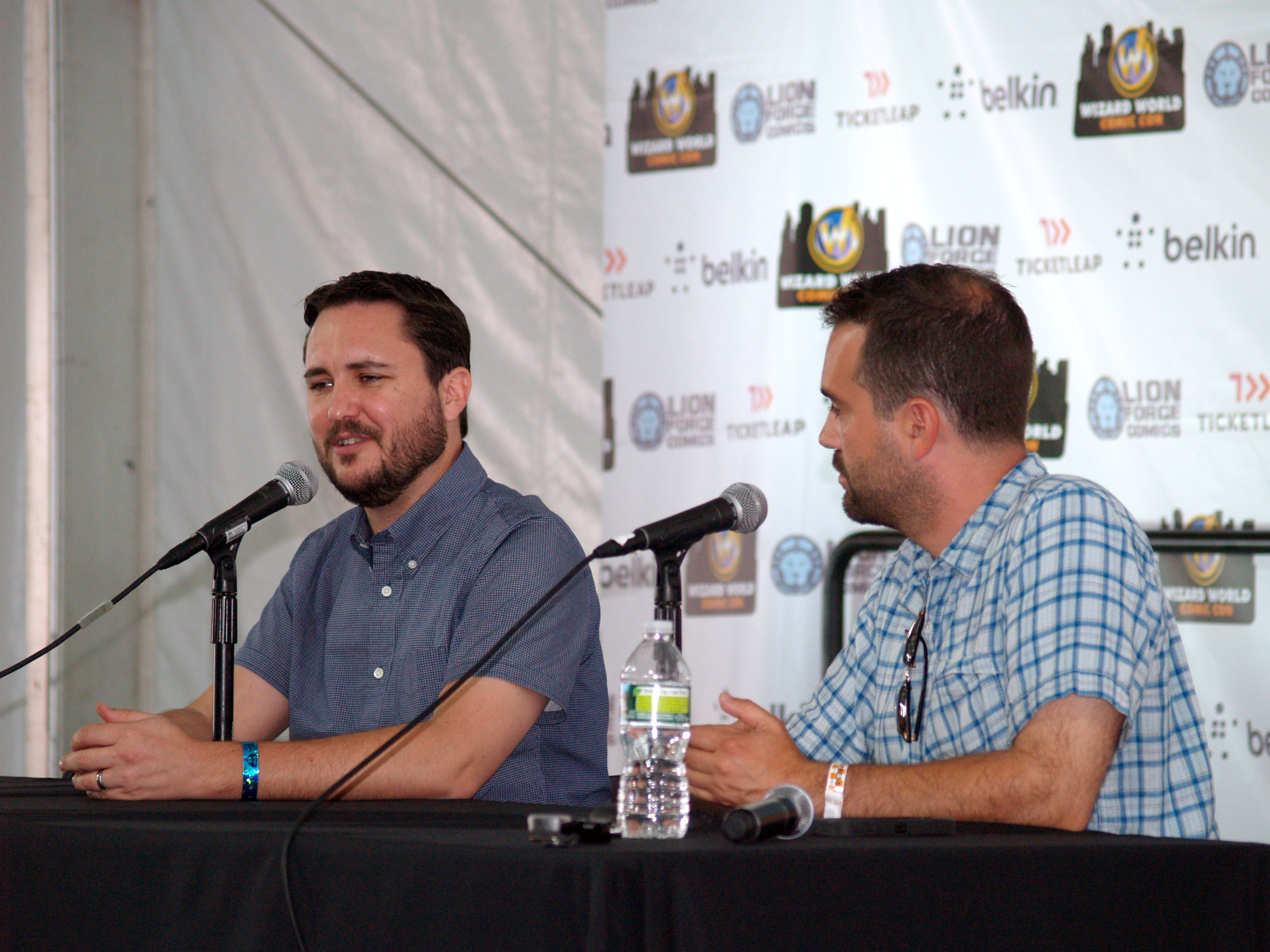
Sagers (right) emceeing a panel discussion with Wil Wheaton at the 2013 Wizard World New York Experience in Manhattan

Sagers began his career in travel journalism with Budget Travel and MSNBC and working freelance before eventually accepting a position with the Tribune Company. He launched the entertainment weekly magazine Merge for The Morning Call newspaper in 2005, and served as an arts & entertainment editor until 2008. He created and wrote the "Pop 20" and "Pop Pundit" syndicated column for McClatchy-Tribune, which ran for more than three years.

In 2009, he launched ParanormalPopCulture.com was to cover "all forms of paranormal popular culture in mass media - and to have fun while doing it" without "proving or debunking the existence of anything beyond the entertainment factor." He takes credit for coining the phrase "paranormal pop culture" and has said in interviews he was motivated to create the site after writing multiple well-received articles on paranormal television, but also because of his childhood fascination of ghost stories around the campfire, monsters, and zombies. His main goal is to examine the "cross section of mainstream pop culture and the paranormal." His work was featured in Entertainment Weekly and The Hollywood Reporter.

As a journalist, Sagers's work has appeared in publications such as The Hollywood Reporter, IGN, Chicago Tribune, The Baltimore Sun, The Philadelphia Inquirer, The Miami Herald, Orlando Sentinel, Orlando Weekly, The Morning Call and Playboy. He began writing for the CNN website in 2011, and Paranormal Pop Culture was a content partner with CNN's "Geek Out!" vertical.

He has been a contributing author for Lonely Planet travel guides for Costa Rica, ABC-CLIO reference guide on pirates in pop culture, and the H.W. Wilson Company reference guide on the paranormal. Sagers was also a guest editor for the TAPS Magazine, the magazine for the Syfy channel's Ghost Hunters, in March/April and May/June 2011. His book Paranormal Pop Culture: Notes from the Entertainment of the Unexplained was released in 2013. He has contributed to pop culture psychology books Doctor Who Psychology and Joker Psychology.

As he gained notoriety for his contributions to the paranormal community, he started to appear on paranormal reality programs. He was a celebrity guest judge on the Travel Channel show Paranormal Challenge in 2010, and worked with Ghost Hunters and Ghost Adventures as a lecturer at paranormal tourism events, and has appeared as a guest on Coast to Coast AM multiple times. Sagers was guest editor for TAPS Magazine, the magazine for the Syfy channel's Ghost Hunters, in March/April and May/June 2011.

Sagers first appeared on camera with CNN in March 2012. He has contributed on-air to the BBC, Huffington Post Live, and began contributing to MTV's Geek site in 2013. He was a guest host for Playboy Radio with Jessica Hall.

In 2012, Sagers co-created, executive produced, and hosted the paranormal entertainment news and lifestyle series Paranormal Paparazzi based on his Paranormal Pop Culture concept along with Zak Bagans. It aired for one season. His book Paranormal Pop Culture: Rambling and Shambling Through the Entertainment of the Unexplained was released in 2013.

In 2013, he appeared as HBO's Game of Thrones expert for morning shows across the nation and Australia, and filmed a Travels with Dracula travel show in Transylvania (with Bram Stoker's great-great-nephew Dacre Stoker), which led to him returning to Romania for his "Vlad vs. Vlad" segments supporting Dracula Untold' home-media release in 2015.

As a TV host and paranormal personality, he appeared on TruTV's Super Into, where he ghost hunted with Aaron Paul in 2015. He hosted the two-hour special episode of Paranormal Lockdown, titled Paranormal Lockdown: Evidence Revealed, with Nick Groff and Katrina Weidman in 2016. Sagers appeared on Reelz's The Shocking Truth to discuss The Conjuring in 2017. He appeared on Portals to Hell's first season 2019.

From 2014 to 2018, Sagers was editor-at-large and producer for Syfy's online presence, previously named Blastr. In this role, he contributed to series Everything You Didn’t Know, and created the series Blastr to the Past, Science of Fear, and Comic Book Roulette.

From 2018 to 2019, he served as an executive producer for Centerboro Productions. In 2019, he joined Fandom as a producer and senior manager of creative for sponsored content.

Since 2020, Sagers has appeared as a "paranormal journalist" and panelist on Travel Channel's and Discovery+'s unscripted clip show, Paranormal Caught on Camera. On the show, he provides context, paranormal theories, and folklore/myth. In 2021, Sagers scripted, produced, and hosted the Ripley's Believe It or Not! Ripley's Road Trip web series.

During the COVID-19 pandemic, Sagers launched the NightMerica true crime/paranormal podcast in 2020 with co-host Britt Emme, and began hosting Paranormal Pop Culture Hour with Den of Geek. This led to the creation of the Talking Strange paranormal podcast for the Den of Geek Network in 2022.

In September 2022, Sagers was revealed to be the co-host on Netflix's first ghost-hunting show, 28 Days Haunted, a series that involves three paranormal investigative teams embedded at three separate locations for nearly a month.
