= Portals to Hell =

American paranormal reality television series

- Genre: Paranormal; Docudrama; Reality
- Presented by: Jack Osbourne; Katrina Weidman
- Country of origin: United States
- Original language: English
- No. of seasons: 3
- No. of episodes: 39

Production
- Camera setup: Multiple
- Running time: 43 minutes

Original release
- Network: Travel Channel
- Release: April 26, 2019 – July 2, 2022

Related
- Paranormal Lockdown

Portals to Hell is an American paranormal reality television series hosted by Jack Osbourne and Katrina Weidman, in which they visit allegedly haunted locations believed to contain portals or entries to hell. The series aired on Travel Channel from 2019 to 2022.

== Episodes ==
=== Series overview ===
Season	Episodes		Originally released	
Season	Episodes		First released	Last released
1	8		April 26, 2019	June 14, 2019
2	18	9	March 13, 2020	June 4, 2020
2	18	9	March 20, 2021	May 8, 2021
3	13		April 9, 2022	July 2, 2022

=== Season 1 (2019) ===
No. overall	No. in season	Title	Location(s)	Original release date
1	1	"The Alaskan Hotel"	The Alaskan Hotel in Juneau, Alaska	April 26, 2019
2	2	"Twin City Opera House"	Twin City Opera House in McConnelsville, Ohio	May 3, 2019
3	3	"Bobby Mackey's Music World"	Bobby Mackey's Music World in Wilder, Kentucky	May 10, 2019
4	4	"Eastern State Penitentiary"	Eastern State Penitentiary in Philadelphia, Pennsylvania	May 17, 2019
5	5	"Emerald Hill Hell House"	McCue Family Estate in Monongahela, Pennsylvania	May 24, 2019
6	6	"Trans-Allegheny Lunatic Asylum"	Trans-Allegheny Lunatic Asylum in Weston, West Virginia	May 31, 2019
7	7	"LaLaurie Mansion"	LaLaurie Mansion in New Orleans, Louisiana	June 7, 2019
8	8	"Strawberry River Inn"	Strawberry River Inn in Ballard, Utah	June 14, 2019

=== Season 2 (2020–21) ===
No. overall	No. in season	Title	Location(s)	Original release date
9	1	"Old Paulding Jail"	Old Paulding Jail in Paulding, Ohio	March 13, 2020
10	2	"Fort William Henry"	Fort William Henry in Lake George, New York	March 20, 2020
11	3	"The Shanghai Tunnels"	The Old Portland Underground in Portland, Oregon	March 27, 2020
12	4	"Iron Island"	Iron Island Museum in Buffalo, New York	April 30, 2020
13	5	"Thomas House Hotel"	Thomas House Hotel in Red Boiling Springs, Tennessee	May 7, 2020
14	6	"Haunted Hill House"	Hill House in Mineral Wells, Texas	May 14, 2020
15	7	"The Croke-Patterson Mansion"	The Croke-Patterson Mansion in Denver, Colorado	May 21, 2020
16	8	"The Ohio State Reformatory"	Ohio State Reformatory in Mansfield, Ohio	May 28, 2020
17	9	"Cary House Hotel"	Cary House Hotel in Placerville, California	June 4, 2020
Part 2
18	11	"McCormick Farm"	McCormick Farm in Stratton, Colorado	March 20, 2021
19	12	"Hotel Monte Vista"	Hotel Monte Vista in Flagstaff, Arizona	March 20, 2021
20	13	"Grant–Humphreys Mansion"	Grant–Humphreys Mansion in Denver, Colorado	March 27, 2021
21	14	"The Stephenson Building"	Stephenson Building in Wymore, Nebraska	April 3, 2021
22	15	"Captain Grant's Inn"	Captain Grant's Inn in Preston, Connecticut	April 10, 2021
23	16	"Pennhurst Asylum"	Pennhurst State School and Hospital in Spring City, Pennsylvania	April 17, 2021
24	17	"Fulton Theatre"	Fulton Theatre in Lancaster, Pennsylvania	April 24, 2021
25	18	"Lake Shawnee Amusement Park"	Lake Shawnee Amusement Park in Princeton, West Virginia	May 1, 2021
26	19	"The Padre Hotel"	Padre Hotel in Bakersfield, California	May 8, 2021

=== Season 3 (2022) ===
No. overall	No. in season	Title	Location(s)	Original release date
27	1	"Hill View Manor"	Hill View Manor in New Castle, Pennsylvania	April 9, 2022
28	2	"Eloise Psychiatric Hospital"	Eloise Psychiatric Hospital in Westland, Michigan	April 16, 2022
29	3	"Taylor Trask Museum"	Taylor Trask Museum in Plymouth, Massachusetts	April 23, 2022
30	4	"Savannah Theatre"	The Savannah Theatre in Savannah, Georgia	April 30, 2022
31	5	"Fort Mifflin"	Fort Mifflin in Philadelphia, Pennsylvania	May 7, 2022
32	6	"Missouri State Penitentiary"	Missouri State Penitentiary in Jefferson City, Missouri	May 14, 2022
33	7	"Malco Theatre"	Malco Theatre in Hot Springs, Arkansas	May 21, 2022
34	8	"Kreischer Mansion"	Kreischer Mansion in Staten Island, New York	May 28, 2022
35	9	"Earnestine & Hazel's"	Earnestine & Hazel's in Memphis, Tennessee	June 4, 2022
36	10	"Victoria's Black Swan Inn"	Victoria's Black Swan Inn in San Antonio, Texas	June 11, 2022
37	11	"Hotel Paisano"	Hotel Paisano in Marfa, Texas	June 18, 2022
38	12	"Pamplin Historical Park"	Pamplin Historical Park in Petersburg, Virginia	June 25, 2022
39	13	"The Enchanted Church"	The Enchanted Church in Sycamore, Ohio	July 2, 2022

== Specials ==
Featured season	Title	Location(s)	Original release date
2	"Watching with the Osbournes"	TBA	April 30, 2020
2	"Frightmare in Connecticut"	Captain Grant's Inn in Preston, Connecticut	October 30, 2020

== Release ==
In the United States, the series airs on the Travel Channel and is also available for streaming on Discovery+. In the United Kingdom and other European territories, it is available via Sky TV and can also be streamed on Discovery+.
