= Trans-Allegheny Lunatic Asylum =

Psychiatric hospital in Weston, West Virginia

- Weston State Hospital
- U.S. National Register of Historic Places
- U.S. National Historic Landmark
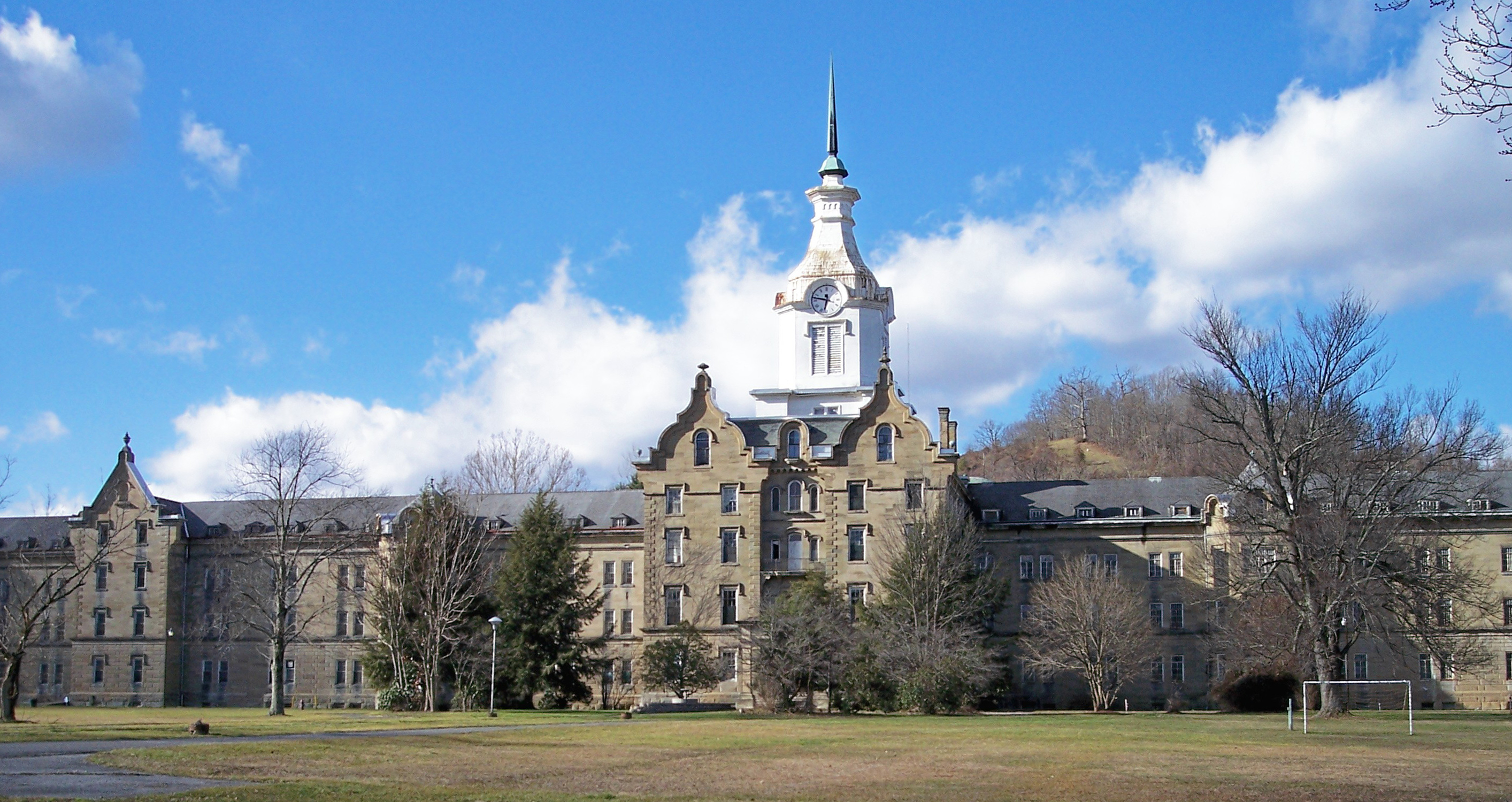
- The Hospital's main building in 2006

- Location within West Virginia Location within the United States
- Interactive map of Weston State Hospital
- Location: Asylum Drive, Weston, West Virginia
- Coordinates: 39°02′19″N 80°28′17″W
- Area: 26.5 acres (10.7 ha)
- Built: Constructed 1858–1881. Opened to patients 1864.
- Architect: Richard Snowden Andrews
- Architectural style: Gothic Revival; Tudor Revival; Kirkbride Plan; Jacobean Revival
- NRHP reference No.: 78002805

Significant dates
- Added to NRHP: April 19, 1978
- Designated NHL: June 21, 1990

The Trans-Allegheny Lunatic Asylum (TALA) was a psychiatric hospital located in Weston, West Virginia, United States. Previously known by other names including the West Virginia Hospital for the Insane and Weston State Hospital, it was open to patients from 1864 until 1994. After its closure, patients were moved to the new William R. Sharpe, Jr. Hospital in Weston, named after William R. Sharpe Jr., a member of the West Virginia Senate. The hospital reopened as a tourist attraction in March 2008.

Utilizing the Kirkbride Plan, the hospital was designed by architect Richard Snowden Andrews of Baltimore, Maryland. Construction of the hospital started in 1858 but was not completed until 1881. In fact, the main building of the hospital is said to be one of the largest hand-cut stonemasonry buildings in the United States and was designated a National Historic Landmark in 1990. Although the building was originally designed to accommodate 250 patients, it became overcrowded in the 1950s with 2,400 patients and eventually closed after years of decline. After being abandoned for several years, the asylum was sold at auction in 2007 and has been open for tours and other events to raise money for its restoration since 2008.

== History ==
=== 19th century ===
The construction of the Trans-Allegheny Lunatic Asylum was authorized by the Virginia General Assembly in 1858. An appointed board of directors was tasked with the purchase of a pre-approved parcel of land near the West Fork River, which at the time was still considered part of the state of Virginia. Construction began in late 1858 and was initially conducted by prison laborers. Most of the building materials were sourced from nearby, with the blue sandstone from a quarry in Mount Clare, West Virginia being most notable; because of this, skilled stonemasons from Germany and Ireland were employed.

Construction was interrupted by the outbreak of the American Civil War in 1861. Following the secession of the state of Virginia from the United States, the government of Virginia demanded the return of the hospital's unused construction funds for its defense. However, before this could occur, the 7th Ohio Volunteer Infantry seized the money from a local bank, delivering it to Wheeling. This money was set aside for use by the Virginia government who remained loyal to the Union, also known as the Restored Government of Virginia. These funds were designated as a “start-up treasury” for what would become a new Union state. Funding was appropriated from this established treasury for the hospital's continued construction in 1862.

While construction was attempted during the war, the grounds and buildings were often occupied by both Union and Confederate military, and building supplies were taken by Confederate raiders. After the end of the war, the completion of construction was prioritized, and following the admission of West Virginia as a U.S. state in 1863, the hospital was renamed the West Virginia Hospital for the Insane. The first patients were admitted in October 1864, but construction continued into 1881. Throughout completion of construction, the 200-foot (61 m) central clock tower was completed in 1871, and separate rooms for black people were completed in 1873. The hospital was intended to be self-sufficient, and a farm, dairy, waterworks, and cemetery were located on its grounds.

Once doors opened to patients in 1864, patients were admitted to the asylum for a variety of reasons, including asthma, laziness, egotism, domestic troubles, and even greediness. This led to an overwhelming number of patients being admitted, causing the asylum to face a shortage of staff and beds.

=== 20th century ===
Throughout the 1900s, the hospital continued to change with a gas well being drilled on the grounds in 1902, and its name was again changed in 1913 to Weston State Hospital. Additionally, the hospital's patient population continued to grow as time passed despite its lack of additional space to accommodate more patients.

Originally designed to house 250 patients in solitude, the hospital held 717 patients by 1880; 1,661 in 1938; over 1,800 in 1949; at its peak, 2,600 in the 1950s in extremely overcrowded conditions. A 1938 report by a survey committee organized by a group of North American medical organizations found that the hospital housed "epileptics, alcoholics, drug addicts and non-educable mental defectives" among its population. Moreover, a series of reports by The Charleston Gazette in 1949 found poor sanitation and insufficient furniture, lighting, and heating in much of the complex, while one wing, which had been rebuilt using Works Progress Administration funds following a 1935 fire started by a patient, was comparatively luxurious.

During their time at the hospital, patients were subject to a variety of treatment methods that are heavily controversial in today's society. Patients often experienced insulin-shock therapy, electroshock therapy, hydrotherapy, and lobotomies. In fact, Weston State Hospital found itself to be the home for the West Virginia Lobotomy Project in the early 1950s. This was an effort by the state of West Virginia and Walter Freeman to use lobotomy to reduce the number of patients in asylums because there was severe overcrowding.

The lack of proper care and access to sanitation coupled with overcrowding led to a large number of deaths at the asylum. While the official count of patients who died in the asylum is not available, research is currently underway to determine an accurate count. The estimated number of deaths could potentially be in or above the five figure range.

By the 1980s, the hospital had a reduced population due to changes in the treatment of mental illness. Those patients who could not be controlled were often locked in cages. In February 1986, then-Governor Arch Moore announced plans to build a new psychiatric facility elsewhere in the state and convert the Weston hospital to a prison. Moore authorized work to begin on the prison conversion, but the state found the move to be unconstitutional and work was ultimately suspended. A new facility, the William R. Sharpe Jr. Hospital, was still built in Weston, and the old Weston State Hospital closed in May 1994. The closure came by court order due in part to a class action lawsuit filed by family members of patients. The building and its grounds have since been mostly vacant, aside from local events such as fairs, church revivals, and tours. However, in 1999, all four floors of the interior of the building were damaged by several off duty city, county and state police officers playing paintball, three of whom were dismissed over the incident.

After its closure, efforts towards adaptive reuse of the building included proposals to convert the building into an American Civil War museum as well as a hotel and golf course complex. A 501(c)(3) non-profit organization, the Weston Hospital Revitalization Committee, was formed in 2000 for the purpose of aiding the preservation of the building and finding appropriate tenants.

=== 21st century ===
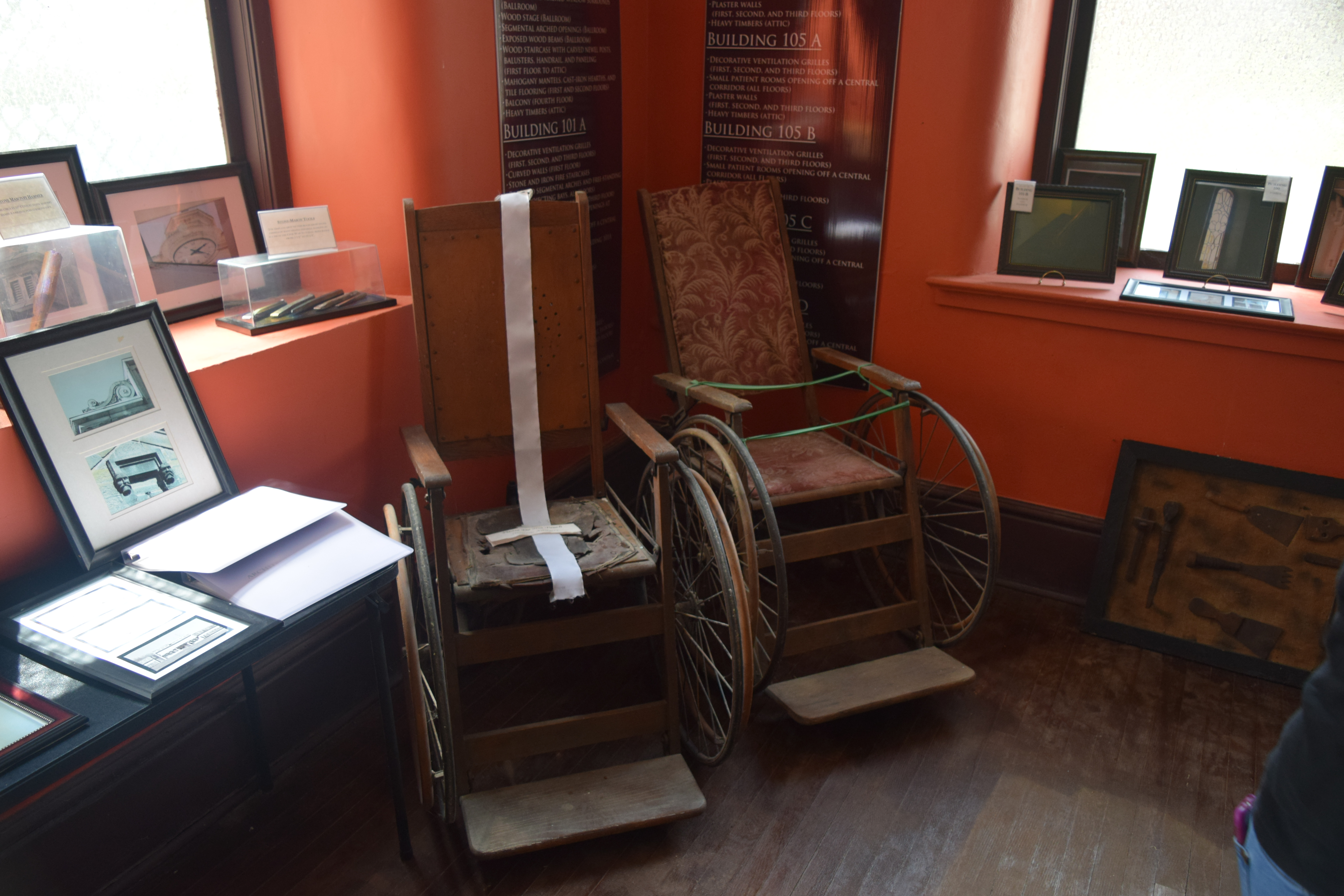
Wheelchairs on display

After being closed for several years, three small museums devoted to military history, toys, and mental health were opened on the first floor of the main hospital building in 2004 but were soon forced to close due to fire code violations.

Three years later, the hospital was auctioned by the West Virginia Department of Health and Human Resources on August 29, 2007. Joe Jordan, an asbestos demolition contractor from Morgantown, was the highest bidder and paid $1.5 million for the 242,000-square-foot (22,500 m^{2}) building. Bidding started at $500,000. After purchasing it, Joe Jordan reverted the hospital's name back to the Trans-Allegheny Lunatic Asylum, its original title, and began maintenance projects on the former hospital grounds. Jordan also reopened the building for tours and seasonal events. Beginning in October 2007, a Fall Festival, including historic tours, paranormal tours, and contests, is held annually at the Weston State Hospital. In addition, the hospital hosts annual flashlight tours, an asylum ball, and a haunted house during autumn, and guided historic and paranormal daytime tours have been offered as well as evening ghost hunts and paranormal tours during the months of March through November since March 2008.

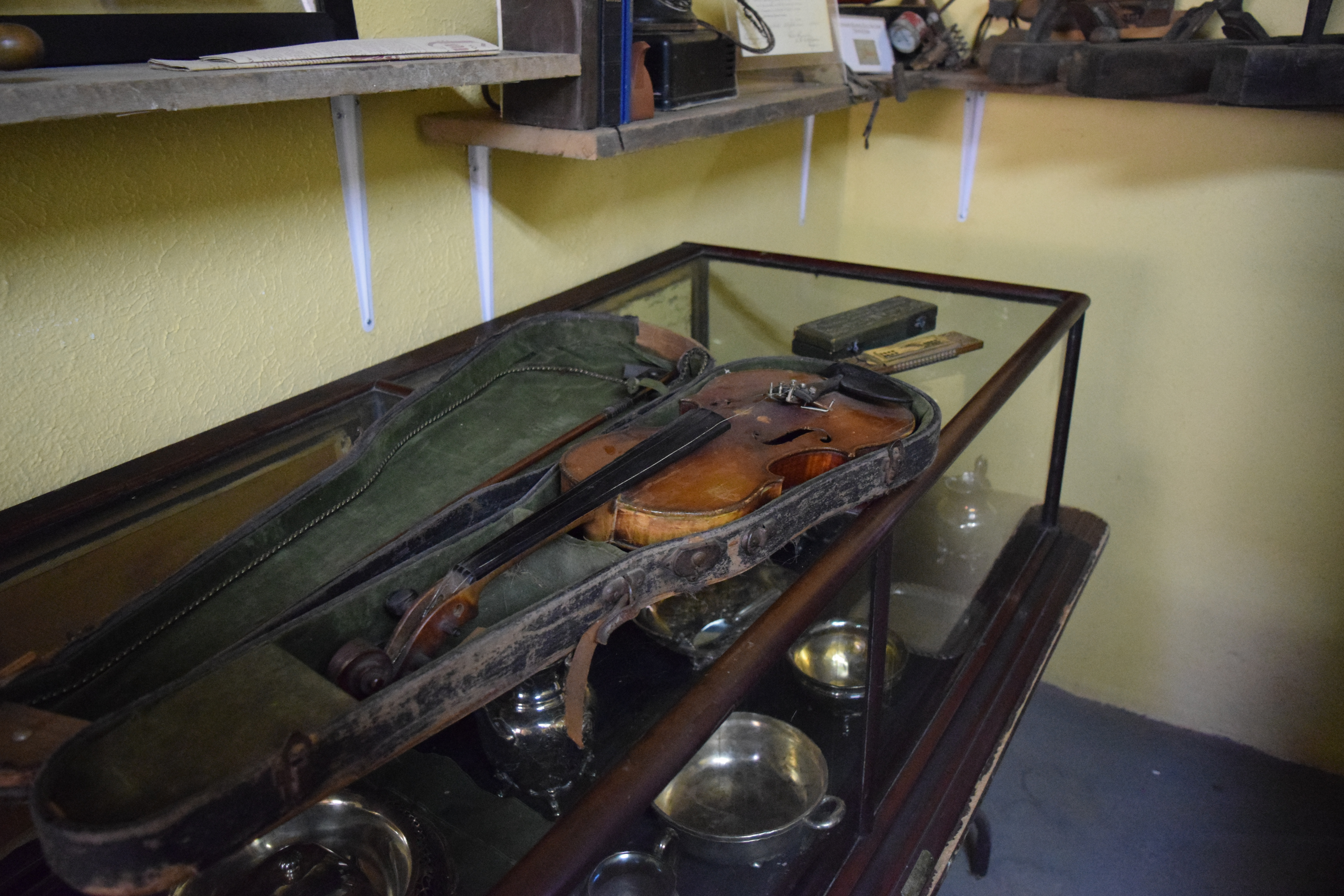
Violin on display in glass case

Since its reopening in 2008, the asylum hosts a variety of tours and opportunities to learn more about its history. The main building of the asylum, known as the Kirkbride, holds several rooms that serve as the museum, located on the first floor. There are paintings, poems, and drawings made by patients in the art therapy programs, a room dedicated to the different medical treatments and restraints used in the past, and artifacts such as a straitjacket and hydrotherapy tub. To make tourists' experience even more memorable, the tour guides dress in clothes that resemble 19th century nurse outfits: blue dress, white apron, white cap, and white shoes. Shorter historical tours allow visitors to see the first floor of the Kirkbride, while the longer historical tour allows visitors to see all four floors, staff apartments, the morgue, and the operating room. Aside from the historical tours, there are also several paranormal tours during the daytime, the nighttime, and that include overnight stays in the hospital.

== In popular culture ==
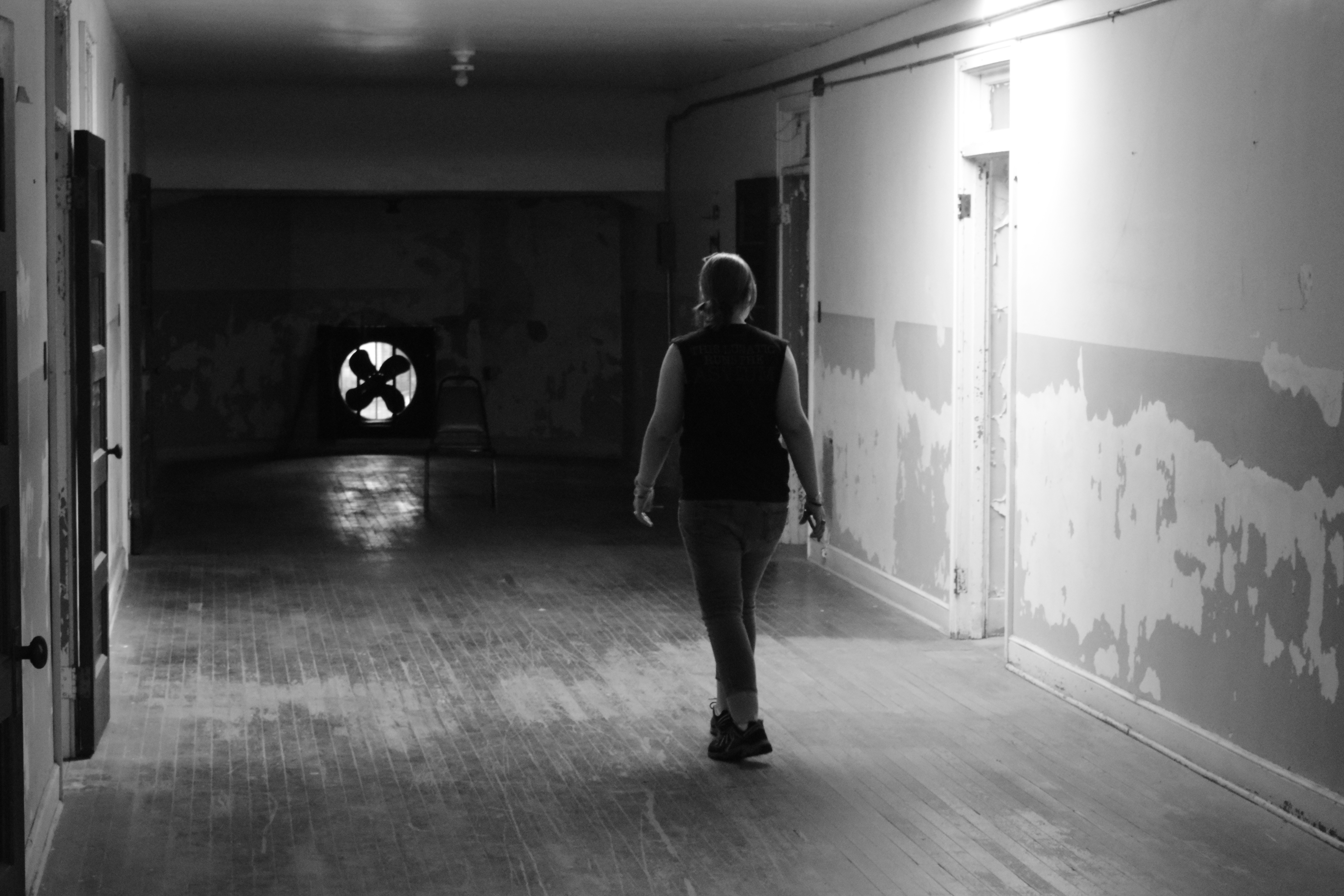
Looking for ghosts, 2017

- The TALA has been featured as a "haunted location" on several paranormal television shows, including Ghost Stories, Syfy's Ghost Hunters, Travel Channel's Ghost Adventures, and Paranormal Lockdown on Destination America/TLC. It has also been featured on Portals to Hell, Sam and Colby, and most recently, Travel Channel's Destination Fear and Conjuring Kesha.
- The facility is featured in Bethesda Game Studios' 2018 video game Fallout 76, as "Allegheny Asylum," and it was renamed "Fort Defiance" when modified for use as a base for The Brotherhood of Steel, one of the game's main factions.
- The facility is featured in episode 60 of the podcast Lore.
- Daniel Johnston, a songwriter, musician, artist, and featured figure in the 2005 documentary The Devil and Daniel Johnston, was a patient at the hospital during the late 1980s.
- The facility is featured on Expedition X, released on the Discovery Channel in August 2024.
- The TALA was featured in the Pulitzer-winning novel Night Watch (2023) by West Virginia author Jayne Anne Phillips. This Civil War era story is partly set in the asylum and explores daily life in the early days of its operation.

== Gallery ==
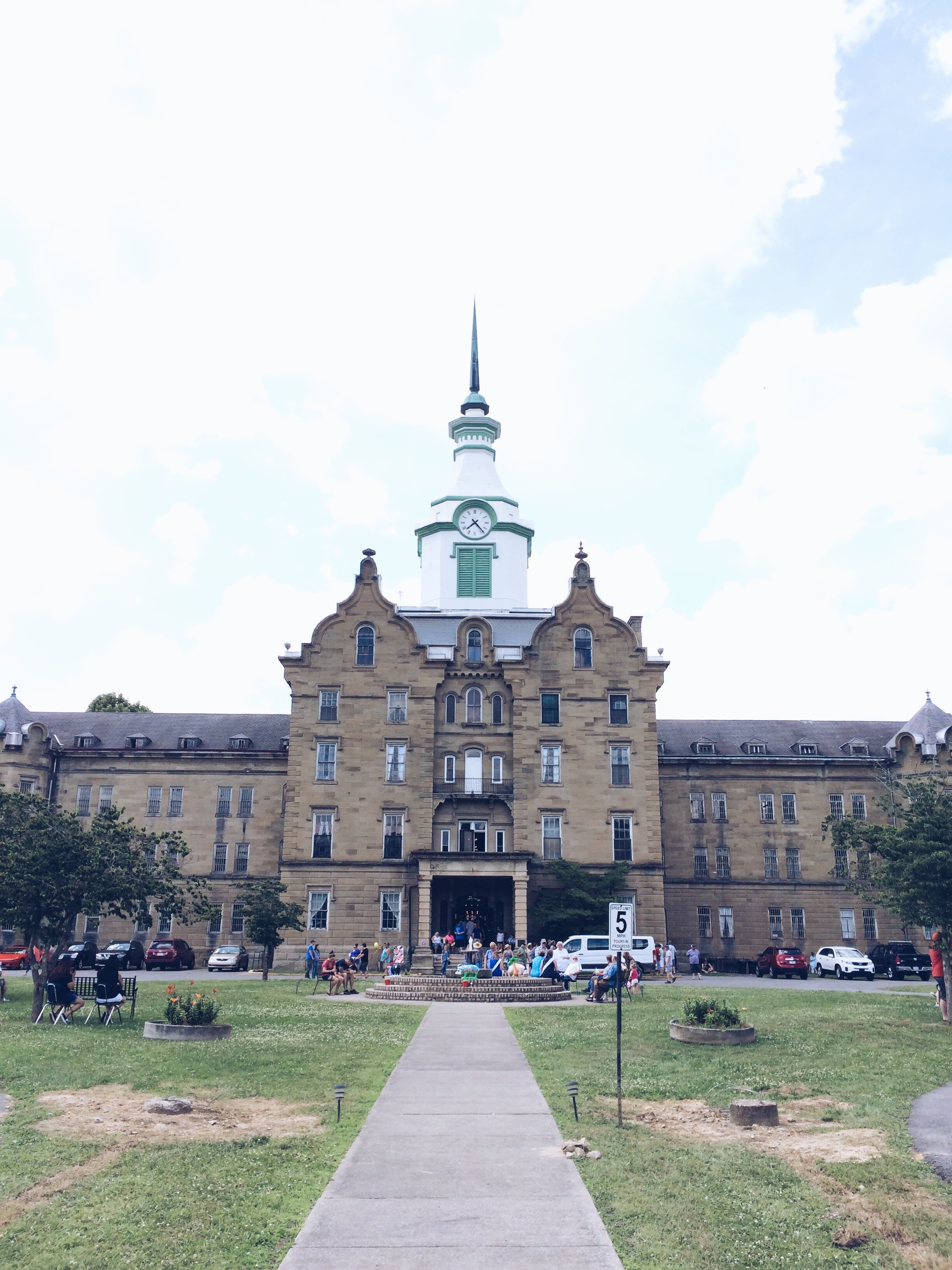
Frontal view of the asylum

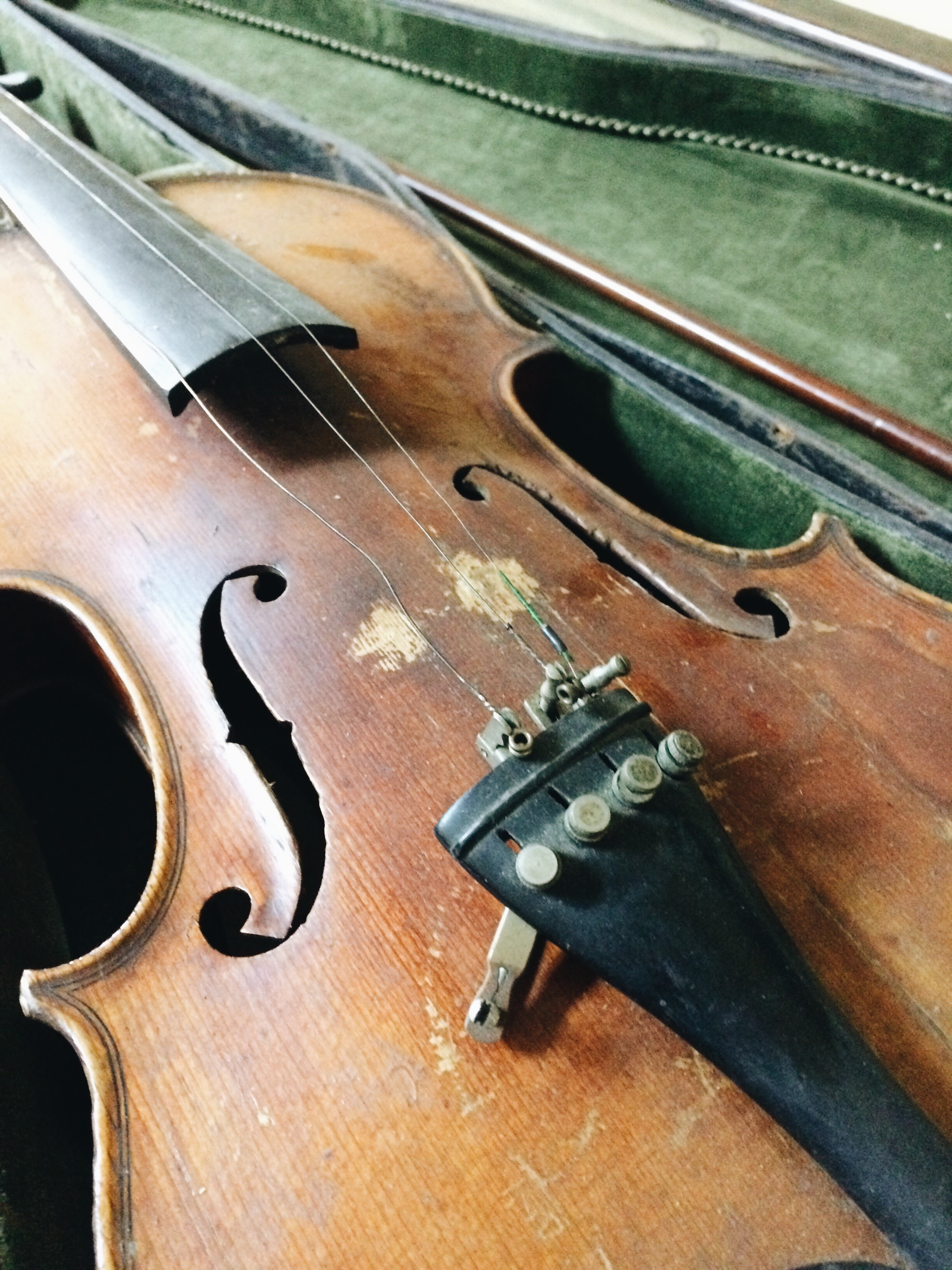
Violin on display

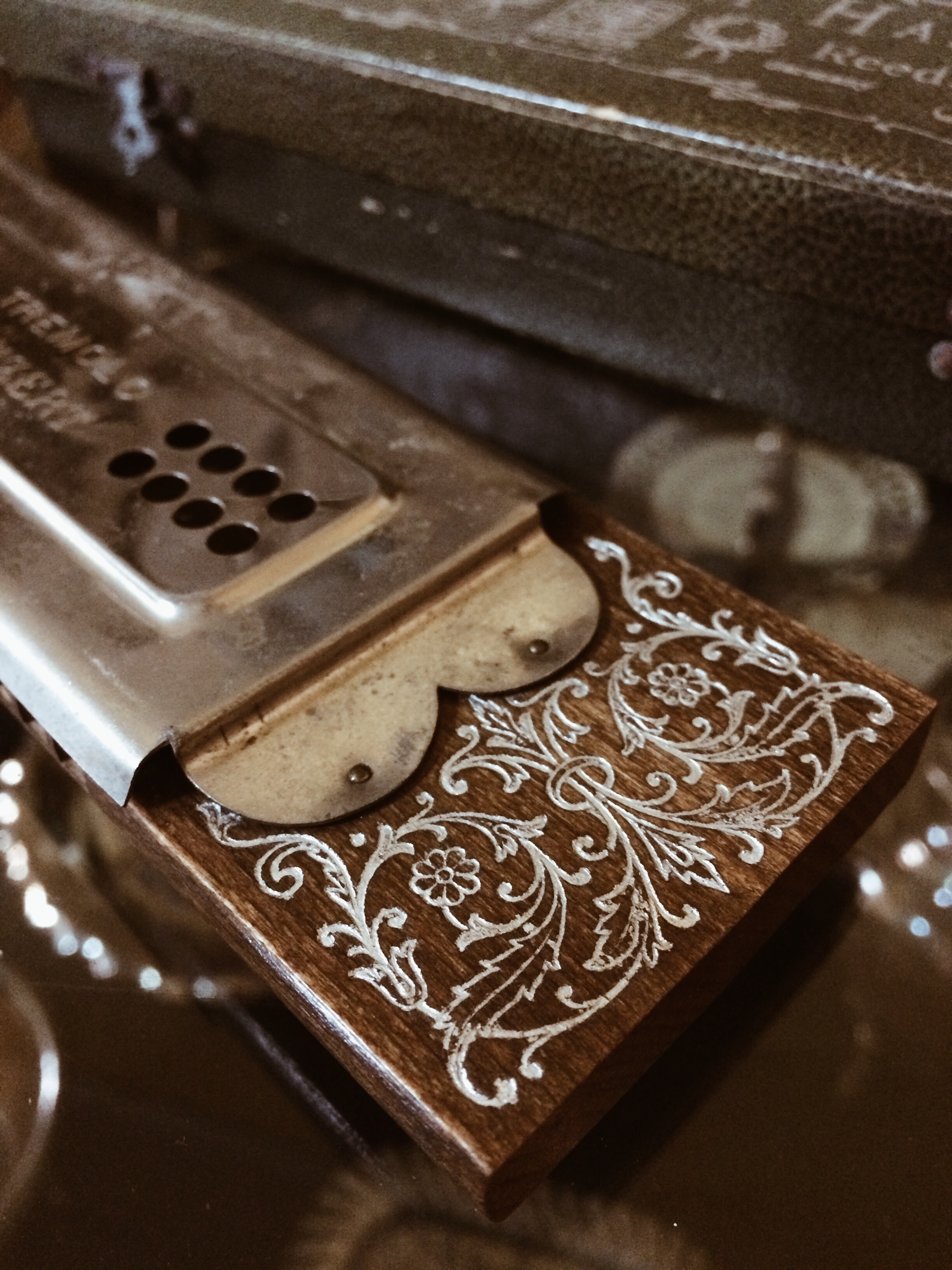
Display

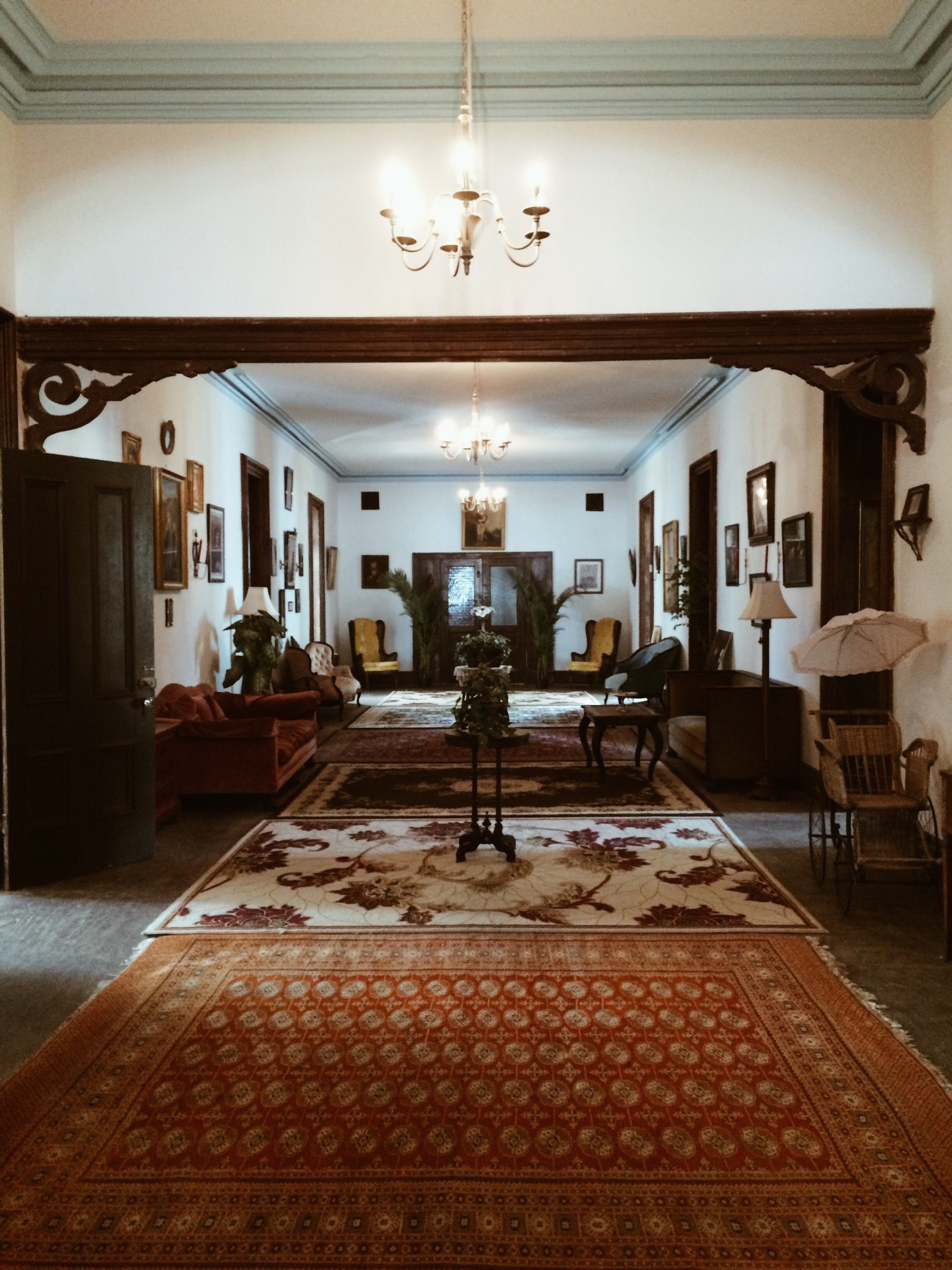
View of a central room in the asylum

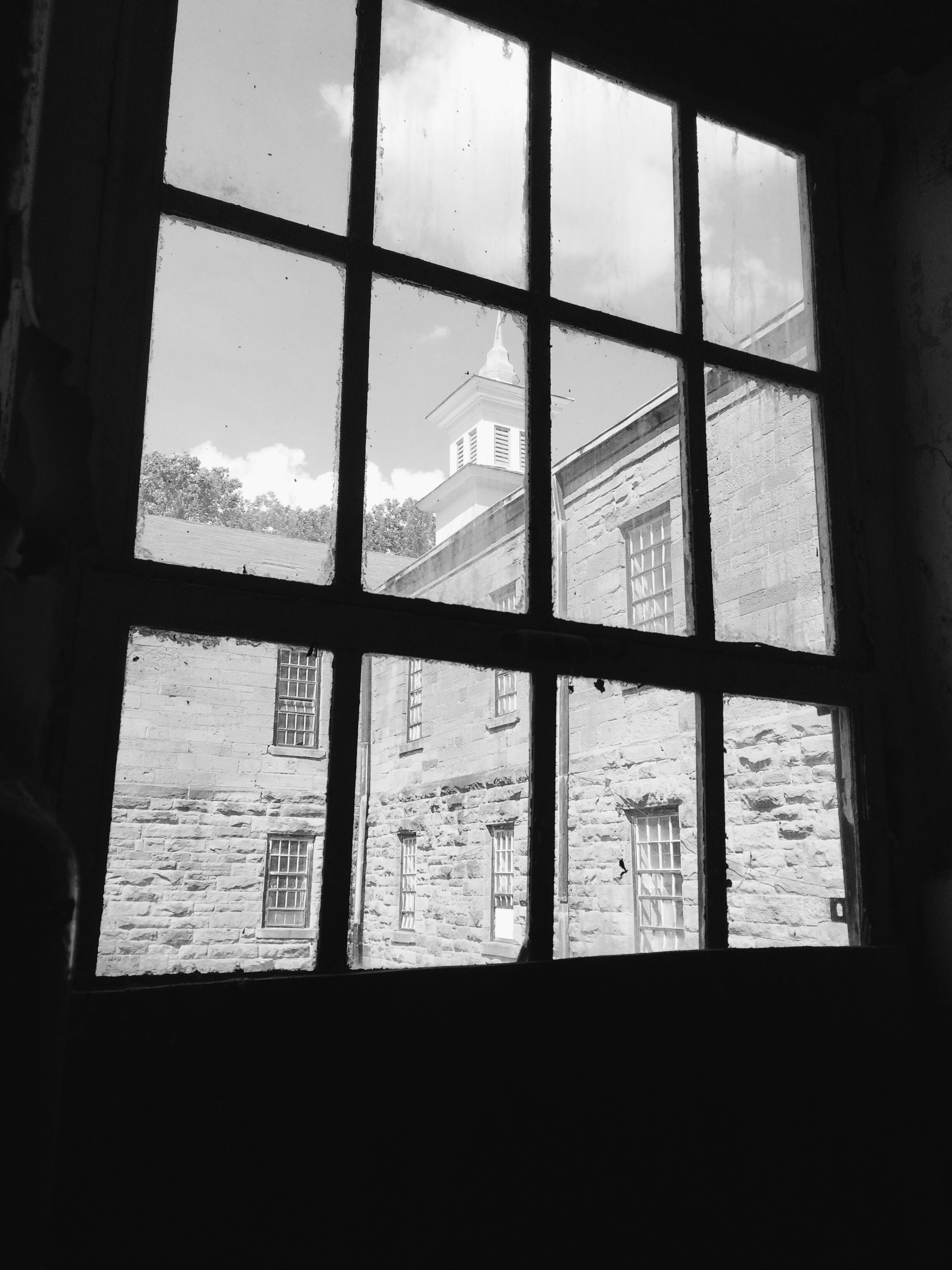
View through an external window

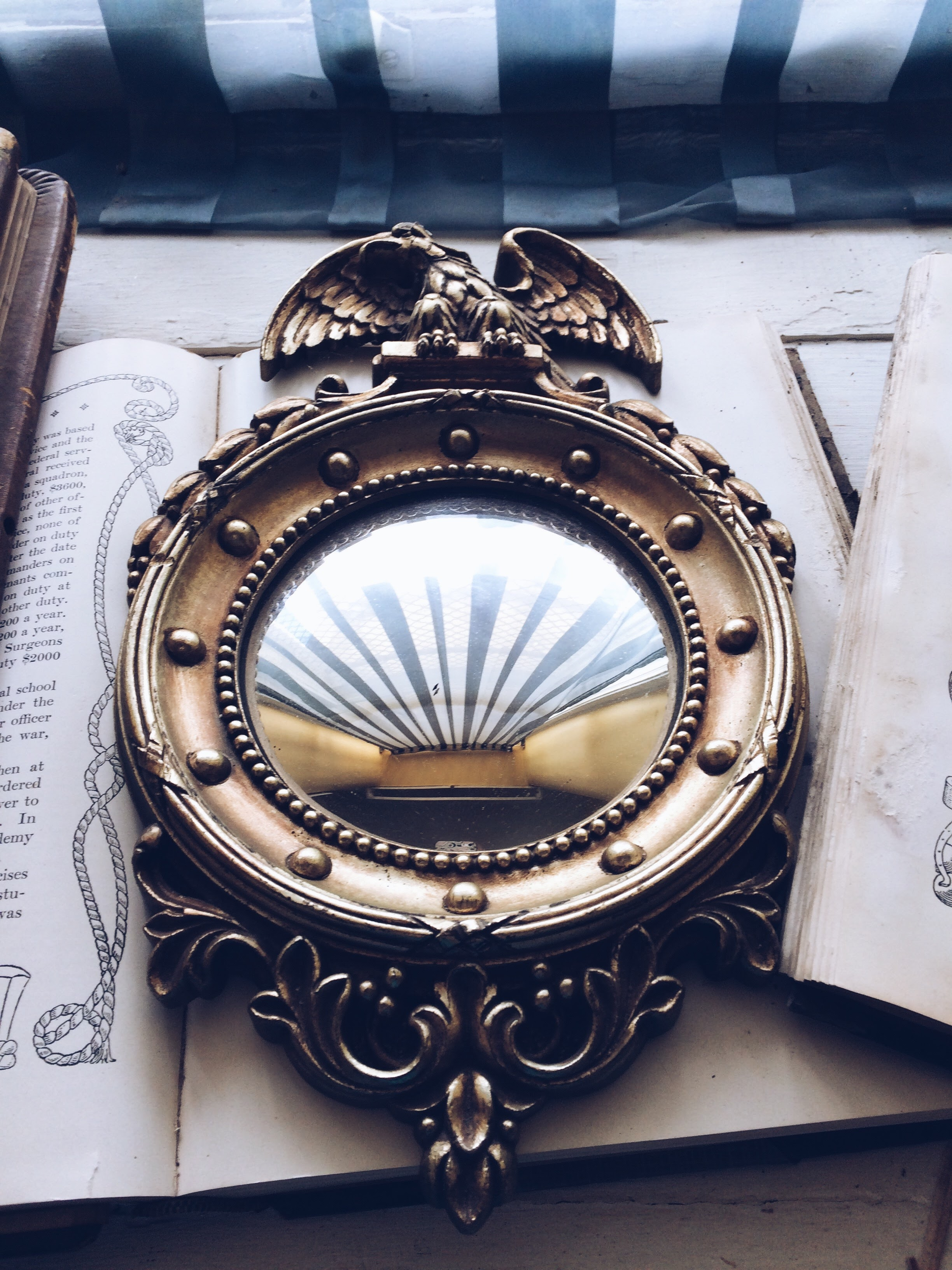
Artifact on display

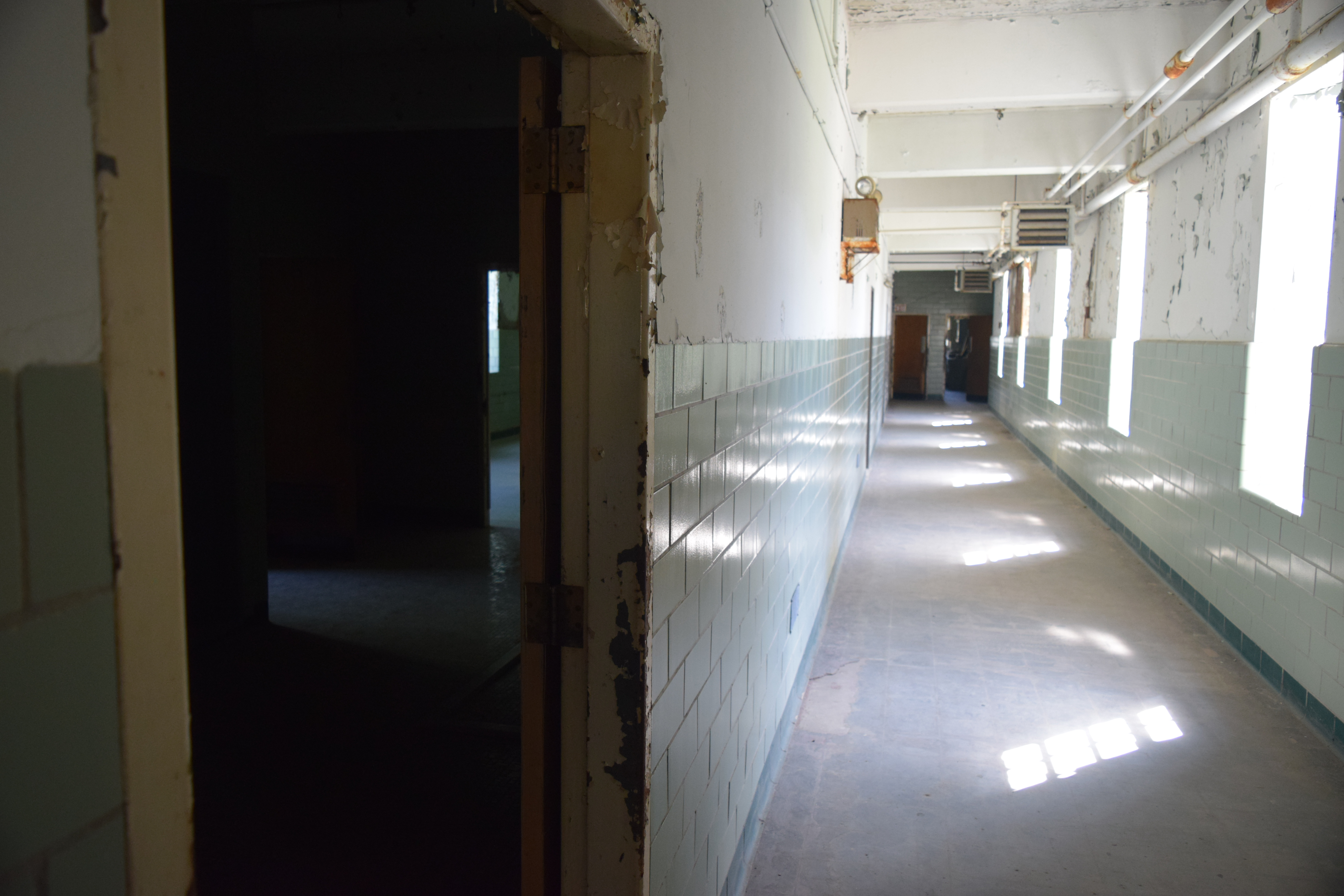
Corridor inside the asylum

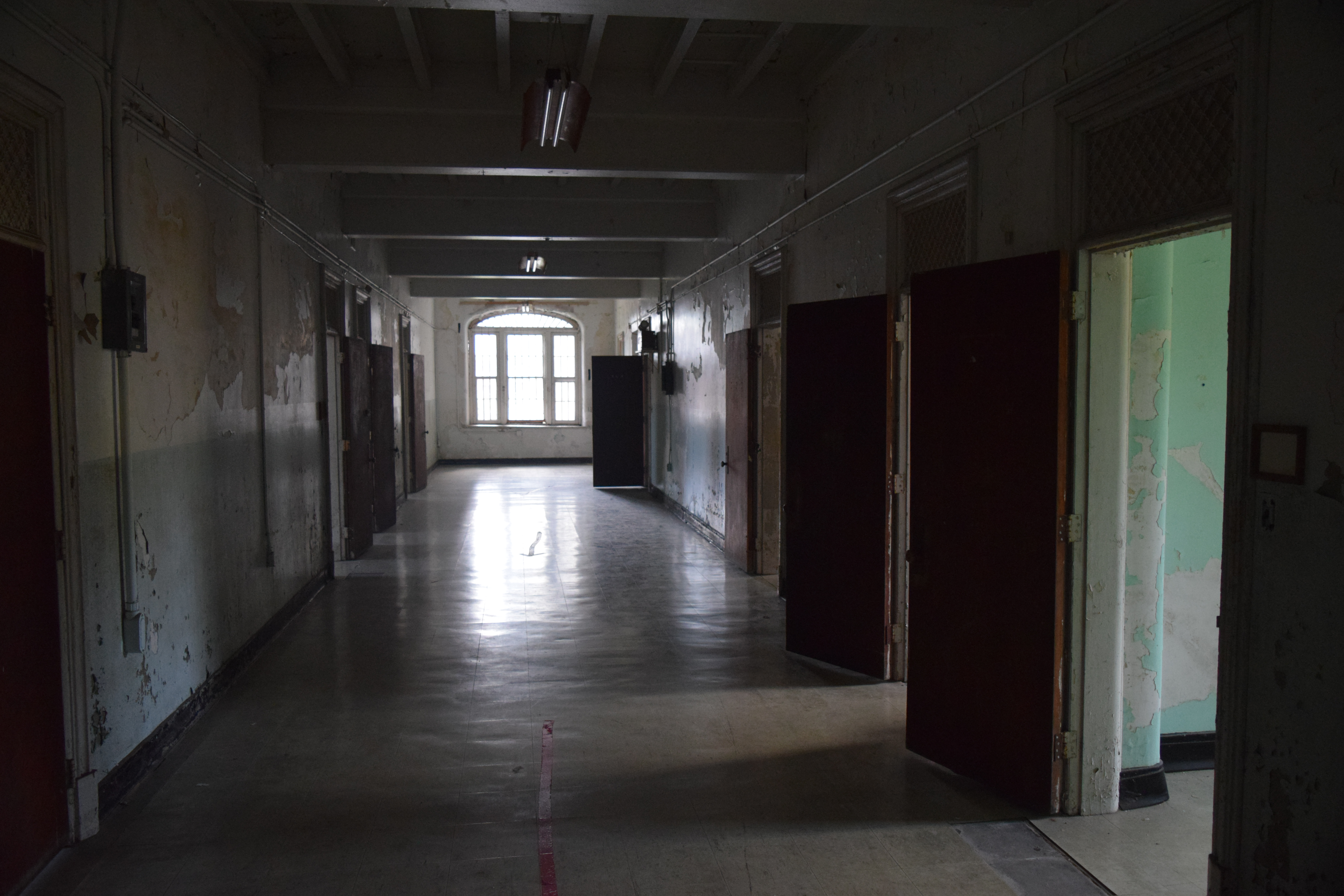
Corridor inside the asylum

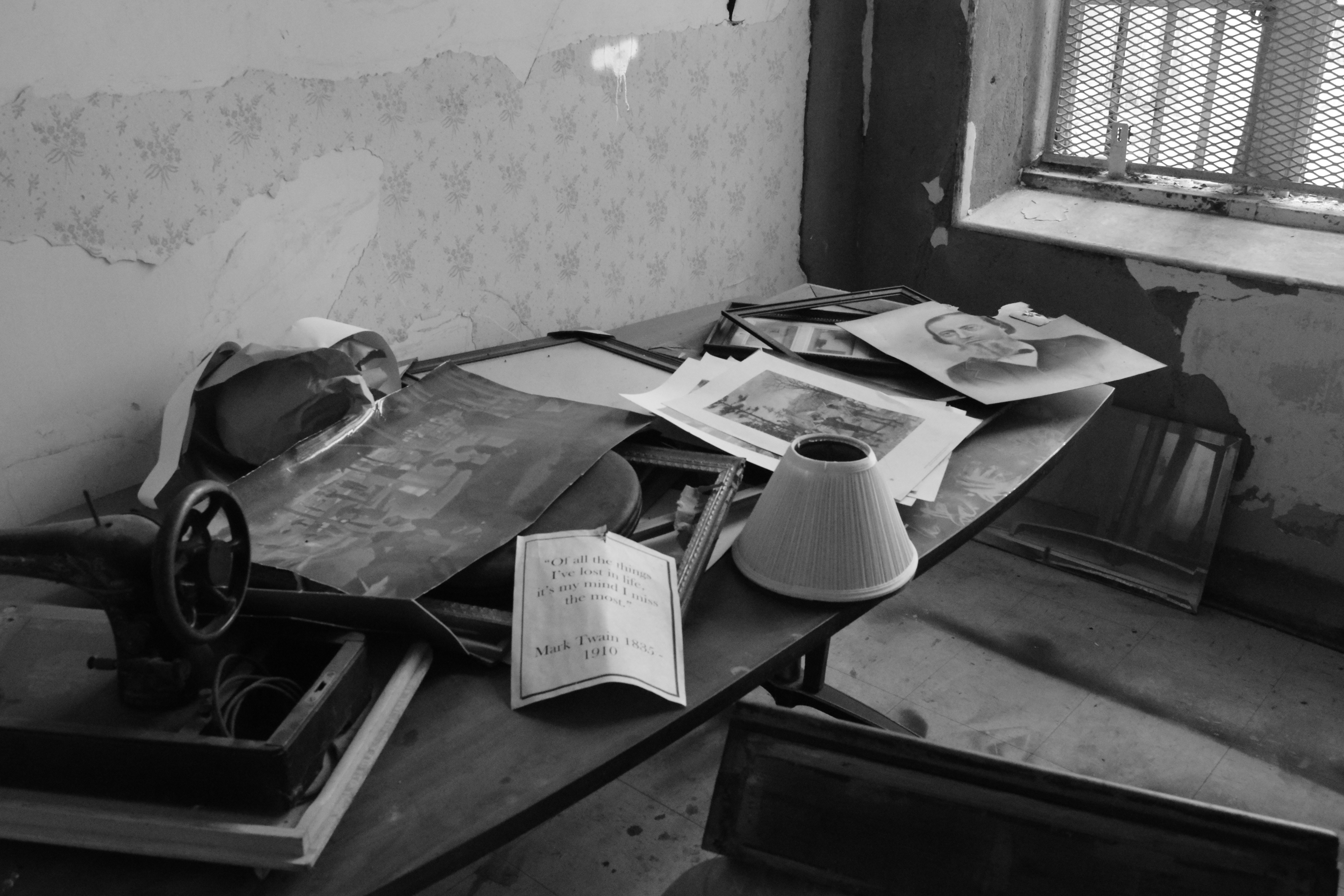
Desk displaying various artifacts

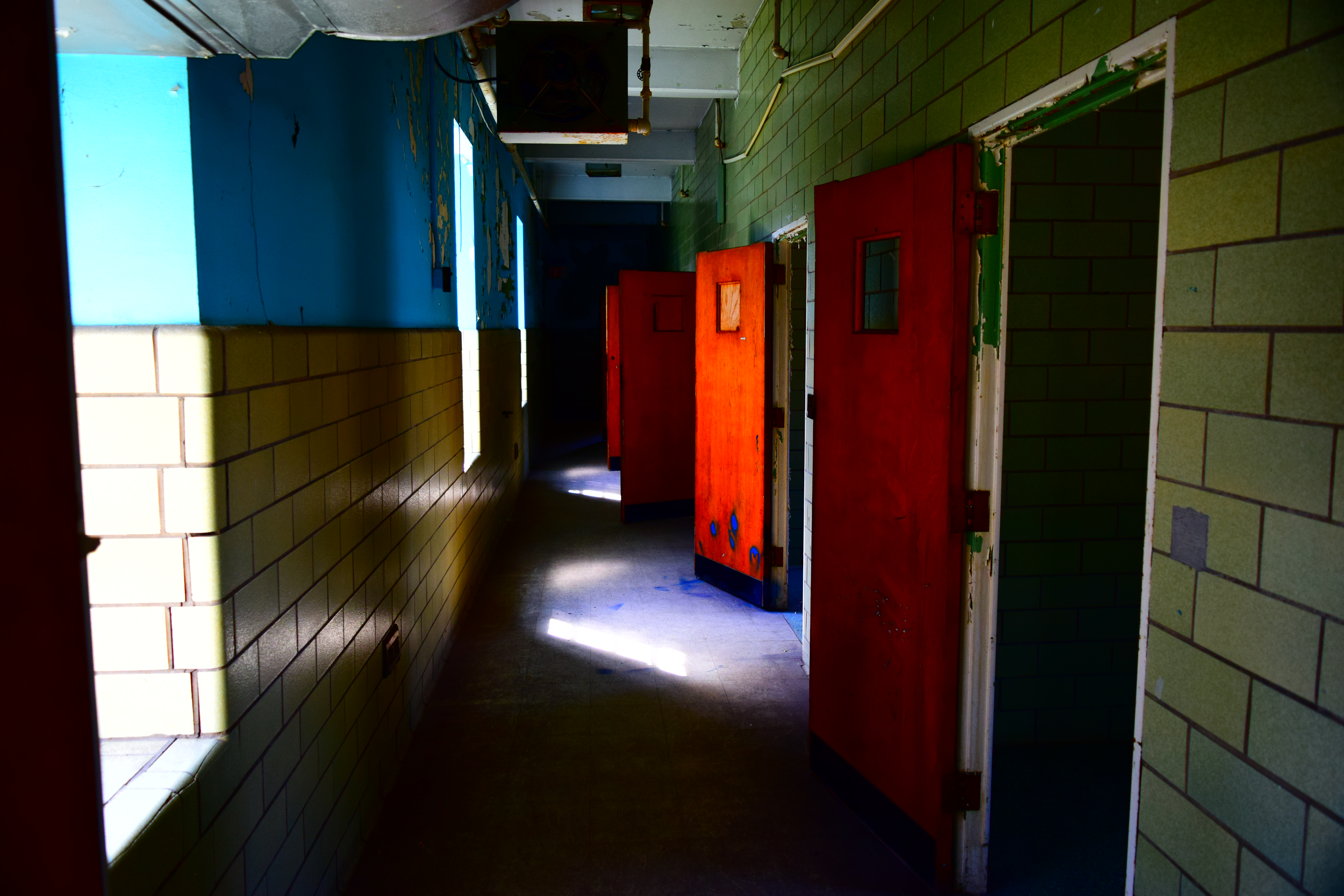
View down a corridor in the asylum

== See also ==
- List of National Historic Landmarks in West Virginia
- National Register of Historic Places listings in Lewis County, West Virginia
- Lakin State Hospital, West Virginia's facility for black mental inmates
