= Hiram B. Scutt Mansion =

Historic house in Illinois, United States

- U.S. National Register of Historic Places
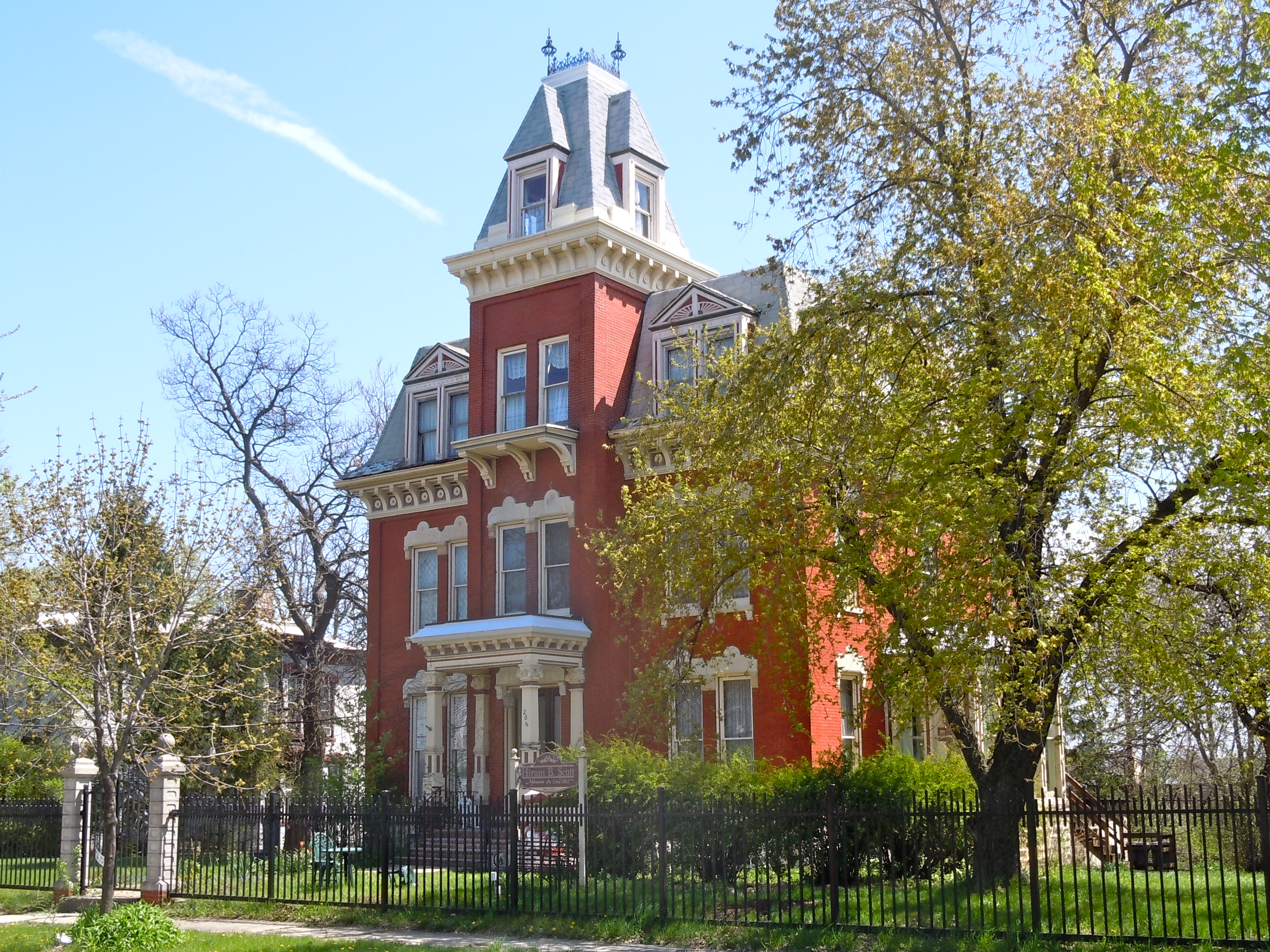

- Location within Illinois Location within the United States
- Location: 206 N Broadway; Joliet, Will County, Illinois, U.S.
- Coordinates: 41°31′37″N 88°5′18″W
- Built: 1882
- Architect: James C. Wesse
- Architectural style: Second Empire
- NRHP reference No.: 02001760
- Added to NRHP: February 5, 2003

The Hiram B. Scutt Mansion or Scutt Mansion, also known as Barb Villa, is a historic residence in Joliet, Illinois.

== History ==
Hiram Scutt was a Civil War veteran who opened H. B. Scutt & Co., the first barbed wire manufacturer in Joliet, in 1874. Scutt held ten patents for varieties of barbed wire fencing. The mansion was designed by Joliet architect James C. Wesse and was built in 1882. It was constructed in the Second Empire style with elements influenced by the Eastlake movement. Scutt sold his business in 1884 and started the Joliet Barbed Wire Company. He also was the president of the Joliet Wire Check Power Company and the Citizens Electric Company. Following his death from a riding accident in 1889, Hiram's son Frank W. Scutt owned the mansion.

The house was later sold to Daniel Watson, who allowed a variety of women's schools, such as the Business Woman's Club House, to operate in mansion. The mansion held such classes until 1977, when it again became solely a single-family residence. Recently, the house has been opened to the public as a banquet hall. It was listed on the National Register of Historic Places on February 5, 2003.

The banquet hall has been further converted into the P. Seth Magosky Museum of Victorian Life by Patrick Magosky, father of local historian Seth Magosky who died in the home during the conversion. Left in its original state of furnishing and decoration, the museum was used for private weddings, corporate meetings, private parties, church groups, and as a movie location. The museum was also a common attraction for a murder-mystery dinner theater and paranormal investigation groups. The museum was closed in January 2013 and all the Victorian era contents and period dolls were taken out.

As of May, 2014, the house is in foreclosure, with the listing price under $160,000. However, nothing on the real estate page alludes to the history of being haunted. The historic haunted mansion of Joliet didn't stay on the market long, and the real estate agent selling the paranormal property credited Patch for getting word out about the foreclosure on North Broadway. "You're responsible for this going viral," agent Maria C. Cronin said, telling how she had 175 people come through a Saturday open house—and that was after she closed the sale of the Hiram Scutt mansion. The national historic landmark fell into foreclosure and was taken by a bank. Cronin listed the property at $159,900 but said a bidding war drove up the price.

== Hauntings ==
It has been determined that two murders have taken place in the estate, as well as the death of (at least) three of the home's owners in the house. Many paranormal investigation groups to have conducted investigation events in the home have also claimed the spirits of children and other entities remain in the house, including the Lady in Black, believed to be Adelaide Scutt, Hiram's Scutt's wife, who is seen dressed in mourning clothes. She saddened by the death of her daughter and husband, Hiram after he fell off his horse and broke his neck.

== On television ==
The Scutt Mansion was featured in a season two episode of Paranormal Lockdown, where former homeowner Andrea Magosky quoted that the "house is cursed" after the house claimed her son Seth who died from an abdominal aneurysm and seriously injuring her husband, Patrick who fell down a spiral staircase he built, breaking his back. She also showed the hosts of the show an upside down horseshoe over a door frame Hiram Scutt put there that she believes is the cause of the curse.
