= Paranormal Paparazzi =

Television series

- Genre: Documentary
- Starring: Aaron Sagers
- Country of origin: United States
- No. of seasons: 1
- No. of episodes: 8

Production
- Executive producers: Aaron Sagers; Daniel A. Schwartz; Joe Townley; Michael Yudin; Zak Bagans
- Running time: 22 minutes
- Production company: My Tupelo Entertainment

Original release
- Network: Travel Channel
- Release: September 28 – November 8, 2012

Paranormal Paparazzi is an American entertainment-and-lifestyle paranormal reality television news series which originally aired on the Travel Channel from September 28, 2012, to November 8, 2012. Based in part on host Aaron Sagers' entertainment website, paranormalpopculture.com, the series is set in a newsroom and showcases paranormal researchers as they investigate locations throughout the United States believed to have paranormal activity.

== Episodes ==
| No. | Title | Original release date |
|---|---|---|
| 1 | "Teen Exorcism Squad" | September 28, 2012 |
| 2 | "Family UFO Abduction" | September 28, 2012 |
| 3 | "Will Ferrell Haunted" | October 5, 2012 |
| 4 | "Amityville Gun Found" | October 12, 2012 |
| 5 | "Jersey Shore UFO" | October 19, 2012 |
| 6 | "Zombie Boot Camp" | October 26, 2012 |
| 7 | "San Diego Chupacabra" | November 2, 2012 |
| 8 | "Nicolas Cage Vampire" | November 8, 2012 |

== Series Cast ==
Julie Alexandria, Rachel Fine, Scott Gruenwald, Dave B. Mitchell, Aaron Sagers, Joshua P. Warren, Branden Wellington, Thom Reed, Jonathon The Impaler Sharkey, Thomas John, Sona Oganesyan, J. Adam Smith, Glen Warner
