= Hot Springs Documentary Film Festival =

Documentary film festival in USA

The Hot Springs Documentary Film Festival
- Location: Hot Springs, Arkansas, United States
- Founded: 1991
- Website: Official Festival Website

The Hot Springs Documentary Film Festival is a documentary film festival held annually in Hot Springs, Arkansas. The festival began in 1991, with a screening of ten Academy Award-nominated documentaries.

== Overview ==
The festival screens 100 documentaries each year and is recognized by the International Documentary Association and the Academy of Motion Picture Arts and Sciences as one of seven national Academy Award qualifying venues. The festival has held monthly screenings throughout the year and mini-festivals in Fayetteville, El Dorado, Tulsa, Oklahoma and Memphis, Tennessee. It has also collaborated with the Hot Springs Music Festival.

== History ==
Notable attendees have included Ken Burns, James Whitmore, James Earl Jones, Diane Ladd, Peter Coyote, Louis Black, Tig Notaro, Waad Al-Kateab, Nanfu Wan, Garrett Bradley, Samuel D. Pollard, Freda Kelly, Tess Harper, Chris Strachwitz and Jose Canseco.

In 2014, it was chosen to be an Academy Award Qualifier in the Documentary Short Subject category.

== See also ==
- Malco Theatre in Hot Springs, owned by the Hot Springs Documentary Film Institute
