= Paranormal Lockdown =

- Genre: Paranormal; Reality TV
- Starring: Nick Groff; Katrina Weidman
- Narrated by: James Lurie
- Theme music composer: Rob Saffi
- Opening theme: "Between Heaven & Hell"
- Composer: Rob Saffi
- Country of origin: United States
- Original language: English
- No. of seasons: 3
- No. of episodes: 37 (plus the 10 specials not included in list)

Production
- Executive producers: Nick Groff; Justin Narragon; Fay Yu
- Producers: Rob Saffi; Kendall Smith
- Cinematography: Rob Saffi
- Editors: Sonny Ratcliff (Lead Editor); Kendall Smith; Benton Stephens
- Camera setup: Multi-camera setup
- Running time: 60 minutes
- Production company: Groff Entertainment

Original release
- Network: Destination America (2016, 2018–2019); TLC (2016–2017)
- Release: March 4, 2016 – February 5, 2019

Related
- Ghost Adventures; Paranormal State; Ghost Hunters; Kindred Spirits

Paranormal Lockdown is a paranormal reality television series that was executively produced by Nick Groff, formerly known from Ghost Adventures. The series follows Nick Groff and fellow paranormal researcher Katrina Weidman (formerly of Paranormal State) as they confine themselves for 72 straight hours in what they claim to be some of the most haunted locations.

The first season aired on Destination America from March 4, 2016 to April 8, 2016. The second season aired from December 16, 2016 to March 3, 2017 on TLC. On November 20, 2018, it was announced that season three would premiere on December 4, 2018, returning to Destination America. On February 14, 2019, Groff announced via a video Instagram post that Paranormal Lockdown would not be returning.

== Premise ==
The series features Nick Groff and Katrina Weidman, two paranormal investigators who are "on a mission to discover something new in the paranormal field", Nick and Katrina both spend 72 hours together in reportedly haunted places. Groff and Weidman believe that "the longer they stay, the more the spirits will communicate with them and the more information they can gather about the unknown". The opening introduction for the show is:

72 hour confinement...in the most haunted locations...in search of groundbreaking evidence.

== Reception ==
Investigator Ben Radford states that the claims of living 72 hours in a haunted house as some sort of a challenge is "absurd." People all over the world claim to live in haunted locations, apparently longer than 72 hours. Before you can claim you are living in a haunted house, "ghosts must be proven to exist", a claim that the paranormal community has yet to prove. There are many methodological problems with their investigative techniques, according to Radford. "They fail to properly investigate and verify their assumptions at virtually every step, making leaps of logic and guessing far beyond the evidence". Lockdowns like what you see on this reality show are using ineffective techniques with equipment not meant to be used for this purpose, to look for something that has not been proven to exist or even defined. "A stakeout (such as these) is essentially a scientific experiment without the science". Completely lacking in controls. "Groff and Weidman... are walking around a house with a camera crew, literally and figuratively in the dark. The only things they're testing are their video editors' endurance and the patience of their viewers. These 'reality' television shows are entertainment, not investigation."

== Cast and crew ==
Crew Member	Job	Notes
Nick Groff	Paranormal investigator	Former star of Ghost Adventures
Katrina Weidman	Supernatural expert	Former star of Paranormal State
Rob Saffi	Cameraman	Joins them on a portion of their lockdown

=== Guest investigators ===
- Amy Bruni – paranormal investigator, formerly of Ghost Hunters (Episode 1.1: "Trans-Allegheny Lunatic Asylum")
- Adam Berry – paranormal investigator, formerly of Ghost Hunters and Ghost Hunters Academy (Episode 1.1: "Trans-Allegheny Lunatic Asylum")
- Grant Wilson – paranormal investigator, formerly of Ghost Hunters (Episode 1.8: "Randolph County Infirmary")
- John Zaffis – paranormal researcher and demonologist, of Haunted Collector (Halloween Special: "The Black Monk House")
- John E.L. Tenney – paranormal investigator, formerly of Ghost Stalkers (Episode 1.3: "Franklin Castle")
- Aaron Sagers – paranormal researcher (Special: "Evidence Revealed")
- Michelle Belanger – occult expert (Episode 2.1: "Monroe House")
- Ben Hansen – former FBI forensic agent and paranormal investigator of Fact or Faked: Paranormal Files (Episode 2.5: "Waverly Hills Sanatorium")
- Steve Huff – paranormal engineer and inventor of the "Wonder Box Portal" (Episode 2.6: "Bellaire House")
- George Brown – paranormal engineer and inventor of the "Geo Box" (Episode 2.6: "Bellaire House")
- Johnny Houser – paranormal investigator (lives next door to Iowa's Villisca Murder House) (Episode 2.9: "Malvern Manor")
- Bloody Mary – voodoo priestess in New Orleans (Episode 2.10: "Rampart Street Murder House")
- Greg Newkirk and Dana Matthews Newkirk – paranormal researchers and haunted object collectors (Episode 2.11: "Scutt Mansion")
- Ryan Dunn – paranormal investigator of the Savannah Ghost Research Society (Episode 2.12: "Old Chatham County Jail")
- Daniel Klaes – paranormal investigator, owner of the Hinsdale House (Episode 1.4: "Hinsdale House Unlocked", Episode 2.6 "Statler City Hotel")
- Lee Kirkland – paranormal investigator from Kentucky (Episode 3.6 "Jim Beam Distillery")
- Elizabeth Saint – paranormal investigator and electrical engineer (Episode 3.8 "Beattie Mansion")

== Series overview ==
Season	Episodes	Network	First aired	Last aired
Specials	10	TLC	October 31, 2016	March 3, 2017
1	6	Destination America	March 4, 2016	April 8, 2016
2	12	TLC	December 16, 2016	March 3, 2017
3	18	Destination America (USA)	December 4, 2018	February 5, 2019
3	18	Really (UK/RoI)	December 12, 2019	April 9, 2020

== Specials ==
No.	Title	Location	Original release date	U.S. viewers (millions)
1	"Halloween Special: The Black Monk House"	Pontefract, Yorkshire, England	October 31, 2016	0.75
In this two-hour Halloween special, Nick and Katrina travel to Yorkshire, England to investigate the Black Monk House, claimed to be haunted by a poltergeist. They are joined by paranormal researcher and demonologist John Zaffis.
2	"Paranormal Lockdown: Evidence Revealed"	Season one locations	December 16, 2016	0.52
Nick and Katrina sit down with paranormal researcher Aaron Sagers in a one-hour special to review unaired footage from season one.
3	"Trans-Allegheny Lunatic Asylum Unlocked"	Weston, West Virginia	January 13, 2017	0.63
Nick and Katrina spend their 72-hour lockdown inside West Virginia's Trans-Allegheny Lunatic Asylum, where it is claimed shadow people exist.
4	"Hinsdale House Unlocked"	Hinsdale, New York	January 20, 2017	0.59
Nick and Katrina go behind-the-scenes, showing viewers how they spent 72-hours locked down inside New York's Hinsdale House where an exorcism was performed.
5	"Anderson Hotel Unlocked"	Lawrenceburg, Kentucky	January 27, 2017	0.59
Nick and Katrina go behind-the-scenes of their 72-hour lockdown at Kentucky's Anderson Hotel, a former hotel that turned into a flophouse which closed in 1987, where several suicides are said to have occurred.
6	"Kreischer Mansion Unlocked"	Charleston, Staten Island, New York	February 3, 2017	0.51
Nick and Katrina go behind-the-scenes of their 72-hour lockdown at Kreischer Mansion.
7	"Franklin Castle Unlocked"	Cleveland, Ohio	February 10, 2017	0.56
Nick and Katrina go behind-the-scenes of their 72-hour lockdown at Franklin Castle, a Victorian mansion built in 1860 that's claimed to be "one of the most haunted houses in America".
8	"Randolph County Infirmary Unlocked"	Winchester, Indiana	February 17, 2017	0.46
Nick and Katrina go behind-the-scenes of their 72-hour lockdown at Randolph County Infirmary, a former poor house built in 1852 and burned down, then turned into an infirmary and nursing home until it closed over a century later.
9	"Monroe House Unlocked"	Hartford City, Indiana	February 24, 2017	0.51
Nick and Katrina go behind-the-scenes of their 72-hour lockdown at Monroe House, claimed to be "the most haunted house on Monroe Street", where they unearth skeletal remains in the crawlspace.
10	"Shrewsbury Prison Unlocked"	Shrewsbury, England	March 3, 2017	0.51
Nick and Katrina go behind-the-scenes of their 72-hour lockdown at Shrewsbury Prison.

== Episodes ==
=== Season 1 (2016) ===
No.	Title	Location	Original release date	U.S. viewers (millions)
1.1	"Trans-Allegheny Lunatic Asylum"	Weston, West Virginia	March 4, 2016	0.39
For 72 hours, Nick and Katrina confine themselves in the Trans-Allegheny Lunatic Asylum in Weston, West Virginia, including Ward F, the Women's Auxiliary Building and the Medical Building's morgue.
1.2	"Anderson Hotel"	Lawrenceburg, Kentucky	March 11, 2016	0.35
In their 72-hour lockdown, Nick and Katrina are the first guests to spend the night at the old Anderson Hotel in Lawrenceburg, Kentucky since 1987, when the then-flophouse permanently closed its doors.
1.3	"Franklin Castle"	Cleveland, Ohio	March 18, 2016	0.40
Nick and Katrina spend 72 hours in the Franklin Castle in Cleveland, Ohio, a Victorian mansion built in 1860 that's claimed to be "one of the most haunted houses in America". They claim to hear a voice pleading for help they believe to be the original owner, Hannes Tiedemann's dead wife, Luise.
1.4	"Randolph County Infirmary"	Winchester, Indiana	March 25, 2016	0.37
Nick and Katrina travel to rural Winchester, Indiana to spend 72 hours inside the abandoned Randolph County Infirmary. This former poor house was built in 1852 and burned down, then it turned into an infirmary and nursing home until it closed over a century later.
1.5	"Hinsdale House"	Hinsdale, New York	April 1, 2016	0.36
Nick and Katrina spend 72 hours in the Hinsdale House in northwestern New York. They claim to see flies, feel choking sensations and have mind tricks played on them. Note: Nick and Katrina tour the home with demonologist Tony Spera, the son in law of Lorraine Warren.
1.6	"Kreischer Mansion"	Charleston, Staten Island, New York	April 8, 2016	0.35
Nick and Katrina spend 72 hours in the Kreischer Mansion, built in the late 1880s by Bavarian immigrant Balthasar Kreischer, who also built mansions for his sons, Charles and Edward. .

=== Season 2 (2016–17) ===
No.	Title	Location	Original release date	U.S. viewers (millions)
2.1 (7)	"Monroe House"	Hartford City, Indiana	December 16, 2016	0.54
Nick and Katrina spend 72 hours in Indiana's Monroe House, where they claim ghostly happenings and evidence of ritualistic occult activity have spooked the homeowner.
2.2 (8)	"Shrewsbury Prison"	Shrewsbury, England	December 23, 2016	0.56
Nick and Katrina spend 72 hours in England's HM Prison Shrewsbury, which opened in 1793 and is said to be the site of 220 years of public executions, suicides, and tragedy, including the prison's last hanging of a possible innocent inmate in 1961.
2.3 (9)	"Oliver House"	Middleborough, Massachusetts	December 30, 2016	0.59
Nick and Katrina spend 72 hours in the historic Oliver House, an estate built in 1769 by loyalist Dr. Peter Oliver Jr., who was banished from the home by a mob during the American Revolution. The house has supposedly been the location of children's deaths and a plague that wiped out most of the Wampanoag population out in the woods.
2.4 (10)	"St. Ignatius Hospital"	Colfax, Washington	January 6, 2017	0.57
Nick and Katrina spend 72 hours in the St. Ignatius Hospital in Colfax, Washington. Built in 1893 by the Sisters of Providence. This former facility is currently an abandoned building.
2.5 (11)	"Waverly Hills Sanatorium"	Louisville, Kentucky	January 13, 2017	0.68
Nick and Katrina spend 72 hours inside Waverly Hills Sanatorium, a former tuberculosis hospital.
2.6 (12)	"Bellaire House"	Bellaire, Ohio	January 20, 2017	0.67
Nick and Katrina spend three days in the Bellaire House, built in 1909 by miner Jacob Heatherington. The home was passed through the family until his descendant Lyde, who died here. Her brother Edwin, devastated by her loss, hired mediums to contact her.
2.7 (13)	"Statler City Hotel"	Buffalo, New York	January 27, 2017	0.68
Nick and Katrina travel to Buffalo to spend 72 hours in the Statler City Hotel and try to make contact with a lonely young woman who committed suicide by jumping out of an 8th floor window in 1947.
2.8 (14)	"White Hill Mansion"	Fieldsboro, New Jersey	February 3, 2017	0.58
Nick and Katrina spend 72 hours in one of New Jersey's historical homes, White Hill Mansion, built by original owner Robert Field in 1722. In its nearly 300 year history, the house has been a battlefield hospital for Revolutionary War And Civil War soldiers, a bordello where two prostitutes were killed, and a speakeasy for mobsters who dumped their victims body in the nearby Delaware River. They claim to make contact with Samuel, the Field family's young son who died there.
2.9 (15)	"Malvern Manor"	Malvern, Iowa	February 10, 2017	0.67
Nick and Katrina travel to Iowa to spend 72 hours in the Malvern Manor and try to make contact with spirits of the dead.
2.10 (16)	"Rampart Street Murder House"	New Orleans, Louisiana	February 17, 2017	0.55
Nick and Katrina spend 72 hours in the Rampart Street Murder House in New Orleans, Louisiana and perform a voodoo ritual.
2.11 (17)	"Scutt Mansion"	Joliet, Illinois	February 24, 2017	0.59
Nick and Katrina spend 72 hours in the abandoned Scutt Mansion in Joliet, Illinois, which they believe to be cursed.
2.12 (18)	"Old Chatham County Jail"	Savannah, Georgia	March 3, 2017	0.67
Nick and Katrina spend 72 hours in the Old Chatham County Jail in Savannah, Georgia before the structure is demolished.

=== Season 3 (2018–19) ===
The second half of Season 3 was billed as Paranormal Lockdown UK.

No.	Title	Location	Original release date	U.S. viewers (millions)
3.1 (19)	"Old Sweet Springs"	Sweet Springs, West Virginia	December 4, 2018 (U.S.) December 12, 2019 (UK & RoI)	N/A
Nick and Katrina visit West Virginia's Old Sweet Springs Resort.
3.2 (20)	"Wildwood Sanitorium"	Salamanca, New York	December 4, 2018 (U.S.) December 19, 2019 (UK & RoI)	N/A
Nick Groff and Katrina Weidman visit the Wildwood Sanitorium in New York where it is claimed furniture is being rearranged and spirits are present.
3.3 (21)	"Higginsport School"	Higginsport, Ohio	December 11, 2018 (U.S.) December 26, 2019 (UK & RoI)	N/A
Paranormal investigators Nick Groff and Katrina Weidman visit the now former Higginsport School in Ohio.
3.4 (22)	"Bobby Mackey's Music World"	Wilder, Kentucky	December 11, 2018 (U.S.) January 2, 2020 (UK & RoI)	0.135
Nick and Katrina visit Bobby Mackey's Music World.
3.5 (23)	"Monroe House"	Hartford City, Indiana	December 18, 2018 (U.S.) January 9, 2020 (UK & RoI)	N/A
After Nick and Katrina found human bones in their first lockdown at the Monroe House, they thought the case was closed. Now they return to explore further.
3.6 (24)	"Jim Beam Distillery"	Clermont, Kentucky	December 18, 2018 (U.S.) January 16, 2020 (UK & RoI)	0.111
Nick Groff and Katrina Weidman visit Kentucky's Jim Beam Distillery to explore claims of spirits.
3.7 (25)	"Old Cambria Jail"	Ebensburg, Pennsylvania	December 25, 2018 (U.S.) January 23, 2020 (UK & RoI)	0.113
Nick Groff and Katrina Weidman explore the Cambria County Jail in Pennsylvania, where they say executions once took place.
3.8 (26)	"Shepton Mallet Prison"	Shepton Mallet, England	December 25, 2018 (U.S.) January 30, 2020 (UK & RoI)	0.095
Nick and Katrina spend 72 hours confined in Shepton Mallet Prison.
3.9 (27)	"Beattie Mansion"	St. Joseph, Missouri	January 8, 2019 (U.S.) February 6, 2020 (UK & RoI)	N/A
Nick and Katrina visit the Beattie Mansion and attempt to contact spirits.
3.10 (28)	"Drakelow Tunnels"	Kidderminster, England	January 8, 2019 (U.S.) February 13, 2020 (UK & RoI)	N/A
Nick and Katrina visit the Drakelow Tunnels to investigate stories of hauntings.
3.11 (29)	"The Royal Oak Pub"	Swanage, England	January 15, 2019 (U.S.) February 20, 2020 (UK & RoI)	N/A
Nick and Katrina visit the historic Royal Oak Pub and investigate tales of restless spirits.
3.12 (30)	"The Abandoned Park Hotel"	Morecambe, England	January 15, 2019 (U.S.) February 27, 2020 (UK & RoI)	N/A
Nick and Katrina visit the abandoned Park Hotel and investigate claims of ghostly activity there.
3.13 (31)	"Newsham Park Hospital"	Liverpool, England	January 22, 2019 (U.S.) March 5, 2020 (UK & RoI)	N/A
Nick and Katrina visit Newsham Park Hospital, a former orphanage claimed to be haunted.
3.14 (32)	"The Skegness Hell House"	Burgh le Marsh, England	January 22, 2019 (U.S.) March 12, 2020 (UK & RoI)	0.116
Nick and Katrina investigate the home of a family who claims it is haunted.
3.15 (33)	"Margam Castle"	Margam, Wales	January 29, 2019 (U.S.) March 19, 2020 (UK & RoI)	0.127
Nick and Katrina investigate the Welsh Margam Castle property.
3.16 (34)	"The Mill Street Barracks"	St. Helens, England	January 29, 2019 (U.S.) March 26, 2020 (UK & RoI)	N/A
Nick and Katrina investigate a barracks said to be haunted.
3.17 (35)	"The Kenton Theatre"	Henley-on-Thames, England	February 5, 2019 (U.S.) April 2, 2020 (UK & RoI)	N/A
Nick and Katrina spend 72 hours inside the Kenton Theatre that is claimed to be haunted by the spirit of a notorious local murderess.
3.18 (36)	"Hinchingbrooke House"	Huntingdon, England	February 5, 2019 (U.S.) April 9, 2020 (UK & RoI)	N/A
Nick Groff and Katrina Weidman conduct their final investigation in the United Kingdom inside a historic 11th century house.

== International broadcasters ==
Country	Network	Ref
Australia	TLC	
United Kingdom; Republic of Ireland	Quest Red; Really	
Germany	TLC	
