= Katrina Weidman =

American paranormal investigator (born 1983)

Katrina Weidman (born March 2, 1983) is an American paranormal investigator who began her career appearing on the A&E series Paranormal State (2007–2011) while a student at Pennsylvania State University. She has since co-starred with Nick Groff on Paranormal Lockdown (2016–2019) and Portals to Hell (2019–2022) with Jack Osbourne.

== Life and career ==
Weidman was raised in Doylestown, Pennsylvania. Her interest in the supernatural began in childhood, as she grew up in a house she believed was haunted.

Weidman attended Pennsylvania State University, where she joined the PRS, whose investigations were the basis of the A&E series Paranormal State. Weidman worked as the PRS's case manager between 2006 and 2011.

In 2016, Weidman began appearing with Nick Groff on the Destination America series Paranormal Lockdown, in which the duo spend 72 hours inside a haunted location with only their camera man and no access to the outside world. From 2019 to 2022, she co-starred with Jack Osbourne on the series Portals to Hell.

In 2024, Weidman and fellow investigator Heather Taddy began developing a new series Mysteries on the Map.

In 2025, Weidman replaced Jayne Harris on Celebrity Help! My House Is Haunted from Season 5, Episode 5 onwards.

== Television appearances ==
- Paranormal State (2007–2011, 85 episodes)
- Paranormal Lockdown (2016–2019, 48 episodes)
- Portals to Hell (2019–2022, 39 episodes)
- Travel the Dead (2022–2023, 2 episodes)
- Celebrity Help! My House Is Haunted (2025, 2 episodes)

== Filmography ==
Year	Title	Role	Notes
2012	Real Fear: The Truth Behind the Movies	Self	Television film; host
2013	Real Fear 2: The Truth Behind More Movies	Self	Television film; host
2013	Kilimanjaro	Funeral Mourner	
2013	The Suspect	Site manager	
2014	Amish Haunting	Iva Troyer	Episode 1x05
2015	The Last Apartment	Caroline	
2015	The Ghost Hunting TV Talk Show: Paranormal TV Stars Special	Self	Television special
2016	MBFF: Man's Best Friend Forever	Lorelai	Short film
2017	Cafe Artist	Boha	
2017	F. Godfather	Pauline	
2018	Who's Jenna...?	Woman at Train	
2018	The View	Self	Television show; episode 21x114
2018	Paranormal Lockdown: Revealed	Self	Television film
2019	Cafe Artist	Boha	
2019	Ok! TV	Self	Episode 4x170
2020	Entertainment Tonight	Self	Episode 39x161
2022	Spectre or Spectacle: A History of the Paranormal	Self	
2023	Haunted Road	Self	Podcast series; episode 4x05
2023	Too Opinionated	Self	Podcast series; episode 572
TBA	Jerith	The Woman	Short film; post production
TBA	F. Pate	Pauline	Post-production
