= Malco Theatre =

- U.S. National Register of Historic Places
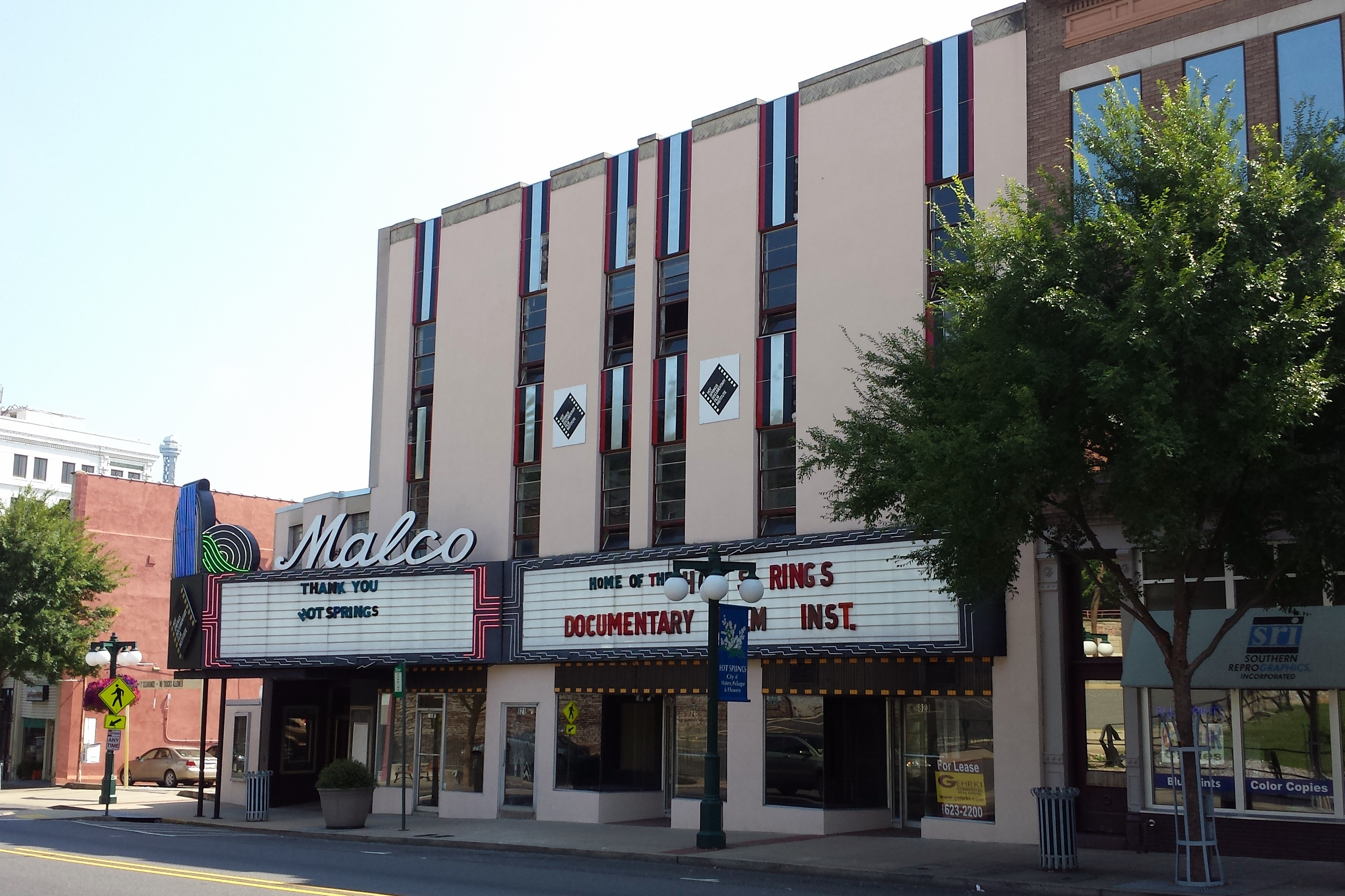

- Location within Arkansas Location within the United States
- Location: 817 Central Ave., Hot Springs, Arkansas
- Coordinates: 34°30′38″N 93°3′15″W
- Area: less than one acre
- Built: 1935
- Architect: Bruggeman & Swaim
- Architectural style: Early Commercial, Art Deco
- NRHP reference No.: 09001246
- Added to NRHP: January 21, 2010

The Malco Theatre, located at 817 Central Avenue in Hot Springs, Arkansas, was built on a site that has housed vaudeville shows, silent movies, modern films, and specialty productions. The Malco, which was frequented by Bill Clinton as a boy, has played host to the prestigious Hot Springs Documentary Film Institute (HSDFI). The Art Deco building was added to the National Register of Historic Places on January 21, 2010. The Malco is currently home to the Maxwell Blade Theatre of Magic & Comedy.

The economy of Hot Springs depended on lodging, dining, and entertainment to support its burgeoning tourism industry. In the late 1800s, Hot Springs attracted visitors from around the country to “take the waters.” After their therapeutic bathing, visitors sought amusements and recreation. At first, this was limited to hunting, fishing, and horseback riding, activities they usually did closer to home as well, but the demand increased for diversions such as gambling and entertainment. In 1882, the Opera House on Hot Springs’ Central Avenue was opened to present theatrical productions, including hosting traveling companies from New York.

In the early 1900s, motion pictures became a leading form of entertainment across the country. Frank Head, manager of the Opera House, commissioned the construction of the Princess Theatre in 1910 for viewing silent movies as well as attending vaudeville shows. It was built where Bridge Street connects Broadway to Central Avenue, the city's main thoroughfare. Hot Springs resident Sidney Nutt Sr. bought the Princess Theatre in 1927, converting it to sound in 1929 as talking pictures began to replace silent films.

Hot Springs’ downtown business district along Central Avenue suffered a number of catastrophic fires in the early 1900s. The Princess Theatre survived until Christmas Eve in 1935, when a blaze destroyed all but its foundation and its masonry entrance on Broadway Street. Those elements would become the cornerstone of the Malco Theatre.

Working with architectural firm Brueggeman and Swaim to utilize the shell of the Princess Theatre, Nutt rebuilt it after the fire. When complete, the irregularly shaped theater had a large auditorium, balcony, lobby, and area for offices facing Central Avenue. The front of the theater included striking Art Deco elements that were popular at the time.

In 1936, Nutt sold his interest in the Princess to M. A. Lightman of Memphis, Tennessee, a successful theater owner throughout the South and founder of the Malco Theatre group. The Princess was renamed the Malco Theatre, with the name incorporating the initials of Lightman. The building was fronted by an elegant, brightly lit marquee to attract the public. The theater was renovated in 1946. With its orchestra and balcony sections holding more than 1,000 seats, it was considered a showplace of the South, boasting the finest projection and sound equipment.

Between 1929 and 1964, entrances were segregated—the “Colored” entrance was on the Broadway side of the building, while the “White” entrance was on Central Avenue. The Broadway entrance allowed African Americans to enter the building and go directly to their segregated seating area in the balcony. With advances in the civil rights movement in the 1960s, segregation of entrances and seating arrangements ended. The Arkansas Historic Preservation Program has stated that the Broadway entrance to the theater may be one of only two such formerly segregated entrances still in existence in the United States. Contemporary news reports stated that the management of the building mandated its preservation as a reminder of America's civil rights victories. During the Cold War era, the building's heavy steel beams and fourteen-inch concrete walls led to the Malco being declared a bomb shelter.

The Malco was remodeled in 1962 and continued to be the leading Hot Springs cinema through the 1980s, although the rise of multi-screen theaters around the country led to the Malco's single auditorium being divided into twin theaters. The Malco continued showing movies through 1995, when it was renovated and came under new management. Magician Maxwell Blade and his Theater of Magic were housed there, joined in 1996 by the HSDFI, which hosts the oldest all-documentary film festival in North America.

The HSDFI became the sole proprietor of the Malco in 2008 after Blade moved to another Hot Springs venue. In 2013, the Malco was purchased by a private owner, Rick Williams, who maintained the Malco's relationship with the HSDFI.

In 2016, Hot Springs’ Sentinel-Record reported that Blade was “going home” to the Malco Theatre. Blade invested in restoring and renovating the aging theater, ahosting its grand re-opening on December 8, 2017. After its renovation, existing vintage tile in the building was restored. The theater boasts design elements such as ceiling tiles, decorative features, and lighting accents that suggest the Art Deco style of the 1920s when Sidney Nutt bought the Princess Theatre and converted it to showing “talking pictures.” However, Maxwell Blade's magic show has also incorporated twenty-first century components such as digital audio and video projection, including three-dimensional backgrounds. Blade has stated that the interior was restored to the way it looked in the 1940s. It has been returned to having one large auditorium rather than being split into two twin theaters. The Malco can currently hold 320 people in its plush seats, as well as another seventy-five in the balcony.

== See also ==
- National Register of Historic Places listings in Garland County, Arkansas
