= Ghost Stalkers =

- Genre: Paranormal; Reality TV
- Written by: Timothy Weisberg
- Starring: Chad Lindberg; John E.L. Tenney
- Composer: Michael Mouracade
- Country of origin: United States
- Original language: English
- No. of seasons: 1
- No. of episodes: 6

Production
- Executive producers: Nick Groff; Chris Bray; Sara Helman
- Cinematography: Rob Saffi
- Editors: Allan Spencer Wall (lead), Eric Paulen, Sonny Ratcliff, Nick Groff, Michael Mouracade
- Camera setup: Multiple-camera setup
- Running time: 45 minutes
- Production companies: Groff Entertainment; Bray Entertainment

Original release
- Network: Destination America
- Release: October 19 – November 20, 2014

Ghost Stalkers is an American paranormal television series that premiered on October 19, 2014, in the United States on Destination America. It is executive produced by Nick Groff of Ghost Adventures. The series features a duo of paranormal investigators that came together over their near-death experiences. They want to prove there are portals in the world's most haunted locations. The show formerly aired on Sundays at 9:00 p.m. But by episode 4, was moved to Thursdays at 9:00pm EST.

== Plot ==
The series follows two paranormal investigators who each went through an alleged near-death experience (NDE). During their investigations, they experiment with trying to find naturally occurring gateways or wormholes which may connect our reality with alternate realities or differing dimensions.

Opening Introduction by narrator:

I'm Chad Lindberg. In 1983, I almost died in a hospital. My name is John Tenney. In 1988, I was pronounced dead. Our experiences with death have led us to believe that some places contain portals, where the dead can cross over into our world. We are on a mission to find them. We're going to spend 48 hours, isolated in some of the rawest, grittiest, haunted locations in the world.

== Cast and crew ==
- Chad Lindberg – Paranormal Investigator and actor
- John E.L. Tenney – Researcher/Paranormal Investigator and author
- David Rountree – Technology Consultant for the show.

== Episodes ==
No.	Title	Location	Original release date
1	"Whispers Estate"	Mitchell, Indiana	October 19, 2014
In the series premiere, the Ghost Stalkers duo of paranormal investigators Chad Lindberg and John Tenney, both bonded by near-death experiences, investigate the Whispers Estate, a Turn of the Century Victorian-style house that some believe is evil. They and many others are convinced that all the negative energy comes from a portal located in the basement, making its way up to the attic where non-human entities are known to come through, including a "goat-man".
2	"Springfield State Hospital"	Sykesville, Maryland	October 24, 2014
Chad and John investigate the abandoned Springfield State Hospital, a former mental hospital that mistreated the mentally insane. The town sits on underground springs, which may be a conductor of all the paranormal activity on the complex, as well as forming a portal or doorway to another world. Chad goes on a solo investigation in the Warfield "W" Buildings which are allegedly the most haunted location on campus; a location where female patients were housed and alleged reports of screaming are heard.
3	"Old Taylor Memorial Hospital"	Hawkinsville, Georgia	November 2, 2014
Chad and John travel to Georgia and revisit their own near-death experiences inside the Old Taylor Memorial Hospital. They make an extraordinary discovery while investigating reports of a vortex inside this abandoned medical building, and capture their best evidence of the supernatural yet.
4	"Holmesburg Prison"	Philadelphia, Pennsylvania	November 6, 2014
Chad and John investigate Philadelphia's Holmesburg Prison, where reports of an oppressive energy, which some believe is related to a centuries worth of prisoner assaults, murders and rioting. While investigating, John comes face-to-face with his own personal demons.
5	"Wheatlands Plantation"	Sevierville, Tennessee	November 13, 2014
Chad and John travel to Tennessee to investigate Wheatlands, a plantation house built in 1825 by the Chandler family who lived and died here throughout centuries. This estate is also where the sordid history of murder, claims of the original owners spirits, and an oppressive paranormal energy from a crystal inside a geode reside. They believe this is where a portal or a doorway to the other side exists because the Cherokees were drawn to the land.
6	"Farrar School"	Farrar, Iowa	November 20, 2014
John and Chad put themselves in danger as they investigate the highly haunted Farrar School, where even though there aren't any documented deaths on the property, there are reports of violent paranormal activity throughout the building. They encounter evil entities, child spirits of former students that are seen running in the halls and a tall dark shadow figure called "The Principal" that aggressively attacks the living and forces them out.
