= Nick Groff =

American paranormal investigator, musician, and television personality

Nicholas Groff (born April 19, 1980) is an American paranormal investigator, musician, and television personality. Groff was the lead investigator for the television series Paranormal Lockdown. He was a co-investigator, executive producer, editor and cameraman on Ghost Adventures from seasons 1–10.

== Early life ==
On April 19, 1980, Nick Groff was born in San Jose, California. Raised in New England, he has been fascinated with the paranormal since childhood, because of his passion for horror movies and some inexplicable experiences within his home and family. Two years after a near-death experience, while at home alone, he says he saw a ghostly black figure. In a 2012 interview, Groff questioned, "Was it my imagination? Or was it something from my accident that made me more open to their world?"

== Career ==
=== Ghost Adventures ===
In 2004, Nick Groff teamed up with Zak Bagans and Aaron Goodwin to produce a documentary-style series called Ghost Adventures. On November 24, 2014, Groff announced that he would not be returning to Ghost Adventures for the upcoming season.

=== Other projects ===
Groff has since produced his own series, Ghost Stalkers (2014) and Paranormal Lockdown (2016–19), in which he was the lead investigator and executive producer

== Filmography ==
Film
Year	Title	Role	Notes
2004	Ghost Adventures	Himself, also executive producer	
2008	Primo	Boris	

Television
Year	Title	Role	Notes
2008–2014	Ghost Adventures	Himself, also executive producer	138 episodes
2012	Vegas Stripped	Executive producer	9 episodes
2012	Nightline	Himself	Guest
2014	Ghost Stalkers	Executive producer	6 episodes
2016–2017	Ghosts of Shepherdstown	Himself	15 episodes
2016–2019	Paranormal Lockdown	Himself, also executive producer	37 episodes and 10 specials
2018	The View	Himself	Guest
2021	Death Walker	Himself, also executive producer	
