= Reportedly haunted locations in Pennsylvania =

The following are reportedly haunted locations in Pennsylvania:

== Gettysburg ==
Gettysburg, the location of one of the most historic battles in the Civil War, is reputed to be one of the most haunted locations in Pennsylvania.

- The Devil's Den is reputed to be haunted by soldiers of the Battle of Gettysburg, Second Day. One infamous soldier in particular has long grey hair, dirty, torn buckskin clothing, a large floppy hat, and no shoes.

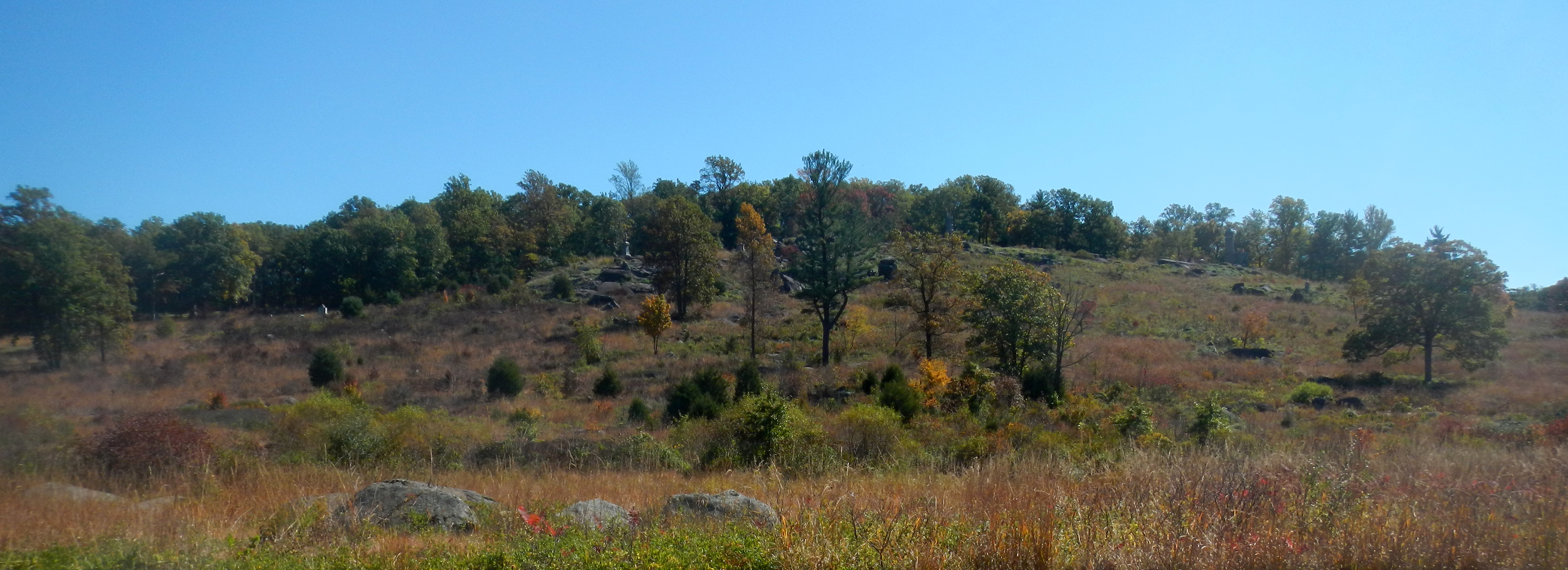
Little Round Top viewed from near Devil's Den in 2015.

- Several stories persist of paranormal activity at Little Round Top. One such story involves American Civil War re-enactors who worked as extras on the film Gettysburg. They claim to have been visited by a man in a Union soldier uniform who they assumed worked on the movie. He passed them ammunition and left. The men assumed the ammunition was blank rounds but later realized it was musket rounds. Later, they learned the ammunition dated back to the Civil War and was in pristine condition.
- The Slaughter Pen is said to be haunted by a little girl in a white dress.
- It has been reported that at Triangular Field cameras will fail to operate without reason, and the sounds of battle are recorded while such activity is not present.

== Philadelphia ==
- The original owner of the building that houses the Academy of Vocal Arts died by suicide, leading to claims that his ghost inhabits the building.
- Visitors to the Bishop White House claim to see the ghosts of an elderly housekeeper on the first floor, a meowing cat, and a tall, thin man on the third floor.
- Leverington Cemetery in Roxborough was listed by WHYY-TV on the top 6 haunted and eerie spots in Northwest Philadelphia and is known as "one of most actively documented locations for orbs and apparitions in Philadelphia".
- It is claimed Physick Mansion is haunted by the namesake's wife, reportedly seen weeping in the yard near the site of her beloved tree that was chopped down shortly before her demise.
- The cemetery of St. Peter's Episcopal Church is said to have a ghost that is seen standing over the grave of Robert Luciano every night at 9 p.m.
- Washington Square is said to be haunted by the ghost of Leah, a Quaker woman that protected the thousands of graves therein from robbers in life.

== Other area hauntings ==
- Old Main, Goethean Hall, and Diagnothian Hall on the campus of Franklin & Marshall College in Lancaster, Pennsylvania is purportedly haunted by soldiers of the American Civil War dating back to their use as a military hospital in the conflict.
- Lebanon Valley College in Annville Township, Mary Capp Green residence hall is claimed to be haunted by a little girl.
- Bolton Mansion in Levittown, also called Phineas Pemberton House, is said to have both an intellectual and residual haunting.
- General Wayne Inn located in Merion, Pennsylvania is alleged to have poltergeist activity (generally of a mischievous nature) and disembodied screams. It is also claimed to be home to manifestations of a Hessian soldier, a British officer seeking a locket, a severed head, and Edgar Allan Poe (a frequent patron in life) according to investigations by Unsolved Mysteries and Haunted History.
- The Dixmont State Hospital near Pittsburgh is said to be home to several entities including a male that would patrol the morgue and try to frighten those that entered the area.
- The former Alpha Sigma Phi fraternity house at Slippery Rock University of Pennsylvania in Slippery Rock is said to be haunted by Samuel Mohawk and his victims of the Wigton Massacre, though the massacre occurred miles away in Brady Township.
- Pennhurst State School and Hospital in Spring City is reported to have numerous accounts of paranormal activity and was featured on the paranormal TV shows Ghost Adventures, Ghost Hunters and Extreme Paranormal. Additionally, it has been featured on the web series Buzzfeed Unsolved.

== See also ==
- List of reportedly haunted locations in the United States
