= Demon House =

- Directed by: Zak Bagans
- Screenplay by: Zak Bagans
- Produced by: Michael Dorsey; Joseph Taglieri
- Starring: Zak Bagans; Jay Wasley; Billy Tolley
- Cinematography: Chris Scarafile; Jay Wasley
- Edited by: Michael Dorsey; Joseph Taglieri
- Music by: Mimi Page
- Production company: Freestyle Releasing
- Distributed by: Freestyle Releasing
- Release date: March 16, 2018 (United States)
- Running time: 111 minutes
- Country: United States
- Language: English

Demon House is a 2018 American documentary horror film directed and written by Zak Bagans, starring Bagans, Billy Tolley, and Jay Wasley as themselves. The film follows the Ammons haunting case and was released in the United States on March 16, 2018, by Freestyle Releasing, with supposedly "lost footage" from the film being released on January 1, 2019 and an Uncut version airing shortly after on February 16, 2019.

== Synopsis ==
Zak Bagans purchases the house in which the alleged Ammons hauntings occurred. Bagans leads a team of paranormal investigators to investigate the house. According to the film, "strange things begin happening" and "the crew becomes fearful of what they may be involved in".

== Cast ==
- Zak Bagans
- Jay Wasley
- Billy Tolley
- Ed Weibe

== Production ==
Zak Bagans, the host of Travel Channel's Ghost Adventures, wrote and directed Demon House, the second film he has made since 2004. The film is based on the "mass hysteria" which surrounded the 2014 alleged demonic possession in Gary, Indiana, of the Ammons family.

== Release ==
The film played in select theaters nationwide before its digital release on March 16, 2018.

=== Critical response ===
On review aggregator website Rotten Tomatoes, the film holds an approval rating of 54% based on 13 reviews and an average rating of 4.3/10.

Steve Barton of Dread Central said the film was one of the "single most compelling documentaries on the existence of the supernatural that I've ever witnessed. Whether or not The Ammons House was haunted or is the portal to hell is still very much debatable".

Noel Murray, writing for the Los Angeles Times called the film "hooey", and said "Zak Bagans' documentary Demon House is essentially an uncensored, overlong episode of his long-running Travel Channel series Ghost Adventures. And while this particular 'paranormal investigation' may terrify the more credulous among Bagans' fan base, skeptics are likely to feel bored and confused."

RogerEbert.com reviewer Nick Allen criticized the film, saying Bagans had "little filmmaking tact other than trying to prove he’s right" amounting to a "hammy enterprise" that "feels more superficial than supernatural".

Skeptical investigator Kenny Biddle reviewed the film, characterizing it as a pseudo-documentary, "meaning it is filmed in a documentary style but doesn't portray real events". Biddle wrote that there was "no actual investigation of paranormal claims; there was ample retelling of experiences and anecdotes, lots of speculation, misinterpretations, and shady editing, but no solid investigating."
