= Deadly Possessions =

- Genre: Paranormal; Reality television
- Created by: Zak Bagans
- Presented by: Zak Bagans
- Starring: Zak Bagans; Aaron Goodwin; Billy Tolley; Jay Wasley; Amber Delly
- Music by: Amber Delly
- Composer: Michael Mouracade
- No. of seasons: 1
- No. of episodes: 6

Production
- Executive producers: Zak Bagans; Joe Townley; Michael Yudin
- Producers: Robin Keats; Brittany Breen; Rick Garrabrant
- Production location: United States
- Cinematography: Michel Stooden; David Ray
- Editors: David Rubin; Carla Beth Smith
- Camera setup: Multiple
- Running time: 45 minutes
- Production company: MY Entertainment

Original release
- Network: Travel Channel
- Release: April 2 – May 7, 2016

Related
- Paranormal Challenge; Ghost Adventures: Aftershocks

Deadly Possessions was an American paranormal reality television miniseries that aired from April 2, 2016 to May 7, 2016 on the Travel Channel. It featured paranormal investigator Zak Bagans of Ghost Adventures as he gathered artifacts for his new museum in Las Vegas, Nevada. The miniseries researched these items and some of the claims of paranormal activity around them.

== Episodes ==
No.	Title	Location(s)	Original release date
1	"Robert the Doll and the Dibbuk Box"	East Martello Museum, Key West, Florida private home, Kirksville, Missouri	April 2, 2016
Zak comes face-to-face with a 100-year-old doll who inspired a horror movie franchise. Then, he consults a Las Vegas rabbi after examining a deadly wine cabinet with a connection to the Holocaust. Guest star: Post Malone
2	"The Conjure Chest and St. Valentine's Day Massacre Wall"	Kentucky Historical Society, Frankfort, Kentucky; Mob Museum, Las Vegas, Nevada	April 9, 2016
Zak examines a once-cursed chest for proof that it can no longer cause death and destruction. Then, he investigates an artifact from one of the most brutal mob hits in US history to determine if it harbors spirits with unfinished business.
3	"Peggy the Doll and John Murrell's Thumb"	TBA	April 16, 2016
Zak holds a seance to break the unhealthy bond between a woman and a powerful doll that has caused serious illness to over 80 innocent people. Then, he investigates the haunted thumb of a vicious bandit forgotten by history.
4	"Bela Lugosi's Mirror and Charles Manson's TV"	private home, Phoenix, Arizona private home, Tuscola, Texas	April 23, 2016
Zak examines a mirror with a connection to a grisly unsolved murder. Then, he investigates a TV infused with the dark energy of the infamous Charles Manson. Will his grandson's baptism lift the Manson family curse?
5	"Ed Gein's Cauldron and the Crying Boy Paintings"	private home, Grand Marsh, Wisconsin private home, Clevedon, North Somerset, England	April 30, 2016
Zak acquires a cauldron once used by an infamous serial killer to cook human body parts. Then, he risks setting the museum ablaze when he investigates two paintings connected to a string of mysterious house fires.
6	"Dr. Kevorkian's Death Van and Natalie Wood's Yacht"	Splendour (docked in harbor), Oahu, Hawaii junkyard, Detroit, Michigan	May 7, 2016
Zak holds an investigation to see if spirits still linger in a van that brought "Dr. Death" to them. Then, he investigates the yacht that was the site of a beautiful movie star's untimely death.
