= Ghost Adventures: Aftershocks =

- Also known as: Ghost Adventures: Aftershocks with Zak Bagans
- Genre: Paranormal; Reality; Documentary
- Created by: Zak Bagans
- Presented by: Zak Bagans
- Starring: Zak Bagans
- Composer: Michael Mouracade
- Country of origin: United States
- Original language: English
- No. of seasons: 4
- No. of episodes: 26

Production
- Executive producers: Zak Bagans; Joe Townley; Michael Yudin
- Producers: Kristen Pietropoli; Casey Dale; Brittany Breen; Sam Rundbaken
- Cinematography: Michael Stodden; Rob Saffi
- Editors: Beth Smith; Dave Rubin
- Camera setup: Multiple

Original release
- Network: Travel Channel
- Release: April 26, 2014 – November 5, 2016

Related
- Ghost Adventures

Ghost Adventures: Aftershocks is an American paranormal documentary and reality television series that aired on the Travel Channel from April 26, 2014, to November 5, 2016. Like the main Ghost Adventures series, the series was hosted and narrated by Zak Bagans.

The show features Bagans revisiting former Ghost Adventures cases. Interviews takes place in an undisclosed location in Las Vegas. New audio and/or video evidence from previous Ghost Adventures episodes are sometimes featured.

== Episodes ==
=== Season 1 (2014) ===
No. overall	No. in season	Title	Original release date
1	1	"Bobby Mackey's and Brookdale Lodge"	April 26, 2014
Host Zak Bagans receives updates from people he encountered on previous lockdowns. Included: The former head of housekeeping at the Brookdale Lodge in California reveals some shocking news; and Zak presents new audio evidence to a skeptic he encountered while at Bobby Mackey's Music World in Kentucky.
2	2	"Villisca Axe Murder House and Letchworth Village"	May 10, 2014
Zak revisits an old crime site in Villisca, Iowa, and meets with a skeptic who describes being scratched by a possible spirit. Also: A young man claims he's addicted to dark entities allegedly haunting an old psychiatric hospital in Haverstraw, N.Y.
3	3	"Bloody Mary and USS Hornet"	May 31, 2014
Zak Bagans revisits his paranormal investigation of the USS Hornet and learns that a voodoo priestess may have put a curse on the team.
4	4	"Sedamsville Rectory and Winchester Mystery House"	June 14, 2014
An update on the owners of Sedamsville Rectory in Cincinnati, one of whom claims to have endured a demonic possession in the historic facility. Also: Zak discusses an experiment conducted at the Winchester Mystery House in San Jose.
5	5	"Palmer House Hotel and Mustang Ranch"	June 28, 2014
The owner of Palmer House Hotel in Sauk Centre, Minnesota, claims to have encountered the ghost of novelist Sinclair Lewis; and Zak catches up with the women who work at the Mustang Ranch brothel in Nevada.
6	6	"Yorktown Hospital and Trans-Allegheny Lunatic Asylum"	September 20, 2014
Zak reopens investigations at Yorktown hospital and Trans-Allegheny Lunatic Asylum.
7	7	"Lizzie Borden and Black Swan Inn"	September 27, 2014
Zak re-visits the black swan inn to investigate a potential possession, and seeks the truth about the Lizzie Borden house.

=== Season 2 (2015) ===
No. overall	No. in season	Title	Original release date
8	1	"Zozo Demon and Katie's Bar"	March 14, 2015
Zak follows up on a homeowner who has purportedly turned to a life of crime; and the proprietor of Katie's Bar in New York reaches out in fear that a spirit is following him home.
9	2	"Bannack Ghost Town and Thornhaven Manor"	March 21, 2015
Zak discovers a paranormal obsession has turned into a family crisis for an investigator from Bannack, Mont.; and later, he spots a disturbing skull-like anomaly in a photo taken at Thornhaven Manor in New Castle, Ind.
10	3	"Sharon Tate Ghost and Linda Vista Hospital"	March 28, 2015
Zak revisits two investigations in Los Angeles. Included: Sharon Tate's house; and the Linda Vista Hospital.
11	4	"Exorcist House and Ohio State Reformatory"	April 4, 2015
Zak investigates mysterious health issues suffered by people who believe demonic spirits are to blame when he returns to the Exorcist House in St. Louis and the Ohio State Reformatory.
12	5	"Stonehouse Brewery and Missouri State Penitentiary"	April 11, 2015
Zak returns to Stonehouse Brewery in Nevada City, Cal., and learns that a blood demon may have caused a young man's suicide. Also: A tour guide at Missouri State Penitentiary reveals that her marriage failed because of her "addiction" to the prison.
13	6	"Bonnie Springs Ranch and Vulture Mine"	April 18, 2015
Zak looks into reports that a tour guide became possessed at Bonnie Springs Ranch in Nevada; and he reacts to sad news about the fate of Vulture Mine in Arizona.

=== Season 3 (2015–16) ===
No. overall	No. in season	Title	Original release date
14	1	"Apache Junction and Fear Factory"	August 8, 2015
Zak revisits investigations in Apache Junction, Ariz., and at the Fear Factory in Salt Lake City. Included: A family believe their home is haunted by a spirit that only their autistic son can communicate with effectively.
15	2	"Texas Horror Hotels and Sloss Furnace"	August 15, 2015
Zak helps a young filmmaker, and survivor of a brutal attack, who has become obsessed with spirits that allegedly haunt a hotel in Seguin, Texas. And later, he gathers compelling evidence of a possession at Sloss Furnaces in Birmingham, Alabama.
16	3	"Bachelor's Grove Cemetery and Waverly Hills Sanatorium"	January 2, 2016
Zak revisits past investigations at Bachelor's Grove Cemetery in Cook County, Ill., and Waverly Hills Sanatorium in Louisville.
17	4	"Shanghai Tunnels and Jerome Grand Hotel"	January 9, 2016
Zak speaks to a woman attached to a spirit of a human trafficking victim during a return visit to Shanghai Tunnels in Portland, Ore. Also: In Arizona, a craftsman at the Jerome Grand Hotel reveals how ghosts helped save his business.
18	5	"Stanley Hotel and Pennhurst"	January 16, 2016
Past investigations of the Stanley Hotel in Colorado and Pennhurst State School and Hospital in Pennsylvania are revisited by Zak.
19	6	"Sallie House and St. James Hotel"	January 23, 2016
Zak reopens past investigations at the Sallie House in Atchison, Kan., and at the St. James Hotel in Cimarron, N.M.
20	7	"Myrtles Plantation and Old Licking County Jail"	June 4, 2016
Zak reopens investigations when he visits the reportedly haunted Myrtles Plantation in Louisiana and the Old Licking County Jail in Ohio.
21	8	"Gettysburg and Cripple Creek"	June 11, 2016
Zak returns to the National Soldier's Orphan Homestead, where a mysterious ghost is haunting the basement. He investigates the Piortowski house again and speaks with Mark Sturgill, former employee of the Colorado Grande Hotel.
22	9	"Moon River Brewery and Alcatraz"	June 18, 2016
Zak returns to the Moon River Brewing Company in Savannah and Alcatraz in San Francisco.
23	10	"Hales Bar and Ashmore Estates"	June 25, 2016
Zak returns to Hales Bar Dam in Tennessee to investigate a former employee's claims that he is still being haunted by ghosts; and both past and present owners of Ashmore Estates in Illinois speak to the host about their personal experiences with spirits.
24	11	"Rolling Hills and Overland Saloon"	August 13, 2016
Zak takes a fresh look at past investigations when he revisits the Rolling Hills Asylum in East Bethany, N.Y., and the Overland Saloon in Pioche, Nev.
25	12	"Riddle House and Pioneer Saloon"	November 5, 2016
A local psychic helps uncover a grim past at the historic Riddle House in West Palm Beach, Fla.; Zak, Nick and Aaron travel to Goodsprings, Nev., to investigate a century-old Pioneer Saloon.

== See also ==
- Paranormal Challenge
- Paranormal Lockdown
- Deadly Possessions
