= Ammons haunting case =

2011 alleged haunting and demonic possession

Coordinates: 41.548279°N 87.328295°W

The Ammons haunting case, also known as the Demon House, is a haunting and demonic possession which occurred in Gary, Indiana, in 2011. Latoya Ammons, her mother, Rosa Campbell, and her three children claimed paranormal activity occurred in the residence. The story was published in 2014 and received national attention.

== Background ==
In November 2011, Latoya Ammons, her mother, Rosa Campbell, and her three children then ages 7, 9 and 12 moved into a house located at 3860 Carolina Street in Gary, Indiana. Days after the family moved in, they claimed black flies swarmed the porch in December and kept returning repeatedly.

Campbell initially heard footsteps in the basement and doors creaking. Later, she alleged to have witnessed a "shadowy figure of a man pacing in the living room" and found a "boot print". Campbell claimed she was choked by an unknown force. Ammons' 12-year-old daughter had claimed to have levitated above her bed unconscious during a sleepover with a friend. They were said to have prayed until the girl returned to the bed. The daughter had no memory of the incident. The older son was allegedly thrown across the room by an unknown force. The younger son allegedly had his eyes roll into the back of his head and was growling saying "it's time to die," and "I will kill you".

The family reached out to their physician, Geoffrey Onyeukwu, on April 19, 2012. When he visited the house during the supposed haunting, he noted their behavior was "delusional". Someone from his office contacted police; after the police arrived, the children were taken to the hospital. The older boy was described as acting rationally, while the younger boy "screamed and thrashed".

In 2012, the Department of Child Services (DCS) was alerted to the family. The DCS believed that the children were performing for their mother. Sensational stories published in outlets such as the New York Daily News reported that DCS personnel had allegedly witnessed the youngest boy "walking up the wall backwards". 37-year police captain Charles Austin believed paranormal activity occurred in the house. A photo published by the Indianapolis Star claimed to show a "shadowy figure" when no one was home.

The family hired Reverend Michael Maginot to perform an exorcism. He interviewed the family on April 22, 2012, and concluded they were being "tormented by demons". He eventually performed three exorcisms, two in English and one in Latin. One exorcism was performed on Latoya Ammons.

The Ammons family moved to Indianapolis in 2012 after which the events were said to have stopped.

== Skeptical analysis ==
Physician Geoffrey Onyeukwu had been skeptical of the entire incident and failed to witness any paranormal incidents. In his medical notes he wrote, "delusions of ghost in home" and "hallucinations". Ammons' children had a history of "irregular school attendance", with a complaint filed against Ammons in 2009. In 2012, she blamed her children's continued irregular attendance on the purported demonic activities.

According to skeptical investigator Joe Nickell, police chief Charles Austin was "an admitted believer in the supernatural, including ghosts". Nickell reported that the photo published by the Indianapolis Star and captioned "Photo by Hammond Police" was, according to the Hammond police chief, not an official photo and was not taken by Hammond police authorities. Nickell also interviewed a number of witnesses and concluded that the supposed supernatural events were either misreported, embellished or exaggerated, or had non-supernatural explanations: The supposed levitation was in fact described by the mother that something "raised her [daughter] up off the bed, snatched her off the bed", implying that the girl simply threw herself upwards, while the "walking up the wall backwards" incident failed to mention that the boy's grandmother was in fact holding his hand throughout, which allowed the boy to push himself against the wall and walk up it.

Landlord Charles Reed stated he had never experienced any supernatural events at the house. His prior tenants also claimed to never have such experiences. At the time, Ammons was behind on lease and used the claimed paranormal activities to avoid payments. The tenant who moved in after Ammons had not noticed any paranormal events, either. Reed believed the events were a hoax.

The children were interviewed by psychologists, and several professionals concluded "the children were acting deceptively and in accordance with their mother's beliefs". Tracy Wright, a psychologist, noted that the youngest son "acted possessed" whenever he was challenged or was asked "questions that he did not wish to answer".

== In media ==
- In 2014, Zak Bagans purchased the house for $35,000 and demolished it in January 2016 after filming a documentary in it, titled Demon House, that was released on March 16, 2018. Dread Central's Steve Barton called it "one of the single most compelling documentaries on the existence of the supernatural that I've ever witnessed." Los Angeles Times reviewer Noel Murray called the film "hooey". According to skeptical investigator Kenny Biddle, the film has been characterized as a pseudo-documentary, "meaning it is filmed in a documentary style but doesn't portray real events".
- The 2024 film The Deliverance is based on the events.
- In 2026, The Why Files featured the Gary, Indiana house on its YouTube channel in an episode entitled Send for a Priest: Three Houses With Something Inside

== See also ==
- Indiana ghostlore
- List of reportedly haunted locations
