= Extreme Paranormal =

2009 American television program

- Starring: Shaun Burris; Nathan Schoonover; Jason Gowin
- Country of origin: United States
- Original language: English
- No. of seasons: 1
- No. of episodes: 2

Production
- Executive producers: Jim Casey; Joseph Carolei
- Producers: Drew Brown; Rob Hammersley; Ross Kaiman; Jill Sparks; Laura Sweet
- Editors: Jason E. Smith; Michael Thau
- Running time: 60 minutes

Original release
- Network: A&E Network
- Release: October 26, 2009

Extreme Paranormal is an American paranormal documentary TV special that premiered on Monday, October 26, 2009, on A&E Network at 10pm EST. It aired as a two-part 1 hour special for Halloween and followed the missions of three paranormal investigators that go to extremes in order to make contact with spirits during their investigations.

== Premise ==
In Extreme Paranormal, paranormal investigators, Shaun, Nathan, and Jason explore local legends, seeking the truth by provoking spirits and recreating tragedies during their investigations. Unlike other paranormal groups, this extreme team puts themselves in harm's way with their aggressive tactics by taunting ghosts, summoning the dead, performing rituals, challenging curses, and daring demons to attack them.

Opening: (narrator: Shaun): "Every town has a legend, a haunting, its own portal to hell. We knock on the door and say, "What's up?" (Show Yourself.) "Can the devil come out and play?" We're not your typical paranormal investigators. We set up experiments to provoke spirits. And we won't back down until we make contact. You can't take the heat. Stay out of hell."

Warning: "The views on the occult and the supernatural documented in this show are those of the investigators. Portions of the rituals in this episode have been omitted for your protection. Do not try this at home!"

== Team Members ==
The team's plan goes like this according to them: "find the center of paranormal activity and keep cranking up the pressure until the spirit shows himself." They're known for provoking spirits and recreating events that are thought to be connected to a person's death. They have 10 years of experience in investigating alleged paranormal activity across America. Every night at midnight, they recount their latest experiences on their popular radio show, Ghostman and Demon Hunter.

- Shaun Burris - Lead Investigator. Narrator, researches history of haunted locations. Co-host of Ghost Man and Demon Hunter Radio Show.
- Nathan Schoonover - Occult Specialist. Performs different types of rituals during investigations. Co-host of Ghost Man and Demon Hunter Radio Show. (Was also featured on an episode of Paranormal Challenge competing with his paranormal team, New Jersey Ghost Hunters Society.)
- Jason Gowin - Tech Expert. Handles all the equipment and builds special devices for cases.
- Tom Maat (additional member for specialized cases) - Empathic shaman. An empath who is able to focus his energies and help paranormal investigators find where the spirits are located. He can sense and feel things from people, spirits around them, and even from the energy in the walls of buildings. He pinpoints the locations of where the most activity is in a place.

Equipment

Parabolic microphone, night-vision camera, EMF meter, K-2 meter, digital audio recorder, thermal camera, and walkie-talkies.

== Episode list ==
=== Season 1 (2009) ===
No.	Title	Locations	Original release date
1	"Pennhurst Insane Asylum & Manchac Swamp"	Manchac Swamp, New Orleans, Louisiana; Pennhurst State School and Hospital, Spring City, Pennsylvania	October 26, 2009
In the two-part premiere special, the team investigates People report strange phenomena at a closed mental institution in eastern Pennsylvania where doctors performed lobotomies on their patients. Then they travel deep in the heart of a swamp to a haunted Louisiana town called Frenier that was wiped out by a hurricane in 1915 caused by the curse of Julia Brown.
2	"New Mexico State Penitentiary & Bonito Lake"	New Mexico State Penitentiary, Santa Fe, New Mexico; Bonito Lake, New Mexico	October 26, 2009
The team travels to a penitentiary where, in 1980, one of the worst prison riots in American history took place. Natan also performs a blood ritual where a prisoner was burned alive. Then they head to a lake that was created from a flood when it was an old mining town called Bonito City in the late 1880s. They conduct the first underwater paranormal investigation and perform a summoning ceremony inside a summoning circle. Note: Shaun and Nate were guards at a juvenile prison in Lockup, Indiana, which helped them out with this investigation.
