= Ghost Adventures =

American paranormal reality television show

- Genre: Paranormal; Reality
- Created by: Zak Bagans
- Written by: Zak Bagans; Devin Lawrence; Jeff Belanger
- Music by: Michael Mouracade
- Original language: English
- No. of seasons: 31
- No. of episodes: 299 (list of episodes)

Production
- Executive producers: Daniel A. Schwartz; Joe Townley; Michael Yudin; Zak Bagans
- Producers: Zak Bagans; Amber Delly
- Production locations: United States; United Kingdom; Italy; Mexico; Ireland; Canada; Jamaica; Romania; France
- Cinematography: Zak Bagans; Nick Groff; Aaron Goodwin; Billy Tolley; Jay Wasley
- Editors: Zak Bagans; Devin Lawrence
- Camera setup: Multiple
- Running time: 42 minutes
- Production company: MY Tupelo Entertainment

Original release
- Network: Travel Channel (2008–2021) (Note: Travel Channel continues to broadcast newer episodes several months after their initial launch on Discovery+.); Discovery+ (2021–present); Discovery Channel (2023–present)
- Release: October 17, 2008 – present

Related
- Ghost Adventures: Aftershocks (2014–2016); Paranormal Challenge; Deadly Possessions; Paranormal Lockdown; Expedition Unknown; Ghost Nation; Kindred Spirits; Destination Fear

Ghost Adventures is an American paranormal and reality television series that premiered on October 17, 2008, on the Travel Channel before moving to Discovery+ in 2021. An independent film of the same name originally aired on the Sci-Fi Channel on July 25, 2007. The program follows ghost hunters Zak Bagans, Aaron Goodwin, Billy Tolley, and Jay Wasley as they investigate locations that are reported to be haunted.

== Premise ==
Ghost Adventures was preceded by an independent film with the same title, produced in a documentary style. It was filmed in 2004 and produced by 4Reel Productions in 2006. The SciFi Channel premiered the film on July 25, 2007. The film centered on the trio's investigation of alleged paranormal activity in and around Virginia City, Nevada, including the Goldfield Hotel in Goldfield, Nevada. The crew returned there during the series' fourth, fifth, and seventh seasons. The series is produced by MY-Tupelo Entertainment (a merger of MY Entertainment and Tupelo-Honey Productions).

=== Methodology ===
Zak Bagans, Nick Groff (seasons 1–10), Aaron Goodwin, Billy Tolley, and Jay Wasley investigate reportedly haunted locations, hoping to collect visual or auditory evidence of paranormal activity. Each episode begins with the crew touring the investigation site with its owners or caretakers. These introductions typically include Bagans's voice-overs of the site's history as well as interviews with people who claim to have witnessed paranormal phenomena there. On the basis of these interviews, the crew place X's with black or gray tape at the sites of some serious alleged paranormal activity. They later return to these spots in order to set up static night-vision cameras to try to film it happening.

After completing the walk-through they discuss their strategy, then are locked in the location overnight, which they believe will prevent "audio contamination" and extraneous shadows. They use a variety of equipment, including digital thermometers, electromagnetic field (EMF) meters, handheld digital video cameras, audio recorders, the Ovilus device, point of view cameras, and infrared night-vision cameras in an effort to capture evidence of ghosts. The members sometimes place objects and shout verbal taunts they believe ghosts might move or respond to.

The video and audio collected during each investigation is analyzed after the investigation, and the whole thing is cut down to fit one hour. The most prominent pieces of evidence found are then presented at the appropriate times they happened during the investigation and each one is explained.

During the series, the crew claims to have captured and experienced various Fortean phenomena, which they say include simultaneous equipment malfunctions such as battery drain, voltage spikes, fluctuations in electromagnetic fields, sudden changes in temperature (such as cold spots), unexplained noises, electronic voice phenomena (EVP), and apparitions.

The crew also claims to have recorded spirit possessions on video. Bagans believes that he was possessed at the Preston School of Industry and at Poveglia Island in Italy. Groff claims that he was overtaken by a "dark energy" at the Moon River Brewing Company. Goodwin claims he was "under the influence of a dark spirit" at Bobby Mackey's Music World and Winchester Mystery House. Goodwin is often left alone in the alleged "hotspots" during lockdowns to see how the spirits will react to him being alone.

== Team members ==
- Zak Bagans (2008–present)
- Aaron Goodwin (2008–present)
- Billy Tolley (2008–present)
- Jay Wasley (2009–present)

=== Former ===
- Nick Groff (2008–2014)
- Dakota Laden (2018-2019)

The following people have appeared as recurring guests in the show as part of the GAC:

- Bill Chappell (2010–2024)
- Mark and Debby Constantino (2008–2014; until their deaths)

=== Celebrity guests ===
Ghost Adventures has involved celebrities who have participated in the investigations or appeared as eyewitnesses:

- The Real Hollywood Ghost Hunters (Kane Hodder, R. A. Mihailoff, and Rick McCallum): "Pico House" episode
- Brendan Schaub – "Peabody-Whitehead Mansion" episode
- Chad Lindberg – "Return to Linda Vista Hospital" episode
- Vince Neil – "The Riviera Hotel" episode
- Jamie Gold – "The Riviera Hotel" episode
- Loretta Lynn – "Loretta Lynn's Plantation House" episode
- Brit Morgan – "Glen Tavern Inn" episode
- Mimi Page – "Glen Tavern Inn" episode
- Post Malone – "The Slaughter House" episode
- Ciaran O'Keeffe – "Hellfire Caves" episode
- Dean Haglund – "Trans-Allegheny Lunatic Asylum" episode
- Loren Gray – "Joshua Tree Inn" episode
- Holly Madison – "Haunting in the Hills" episode
- Jonathan Davis – "Glen Tavern Tragedy" episode
- Matt Rife – "Abandoned at Whiskey Pete's" episode

== Series overview ==
=== Episodes ===
Season	Episodes	Originally released		
Season	Episodes	First released	Last released	Network
1	8	October 17, 2008	December 5, 2008	Travel Channel
2	8	June 5, 2009	July 24, 2009	Travel Channel
3	10	November 6, 2009	January 8, 2010	Travel Channel
4	27	September 17, 2010	June 10, 2011	Travel Channel
5	10	September 23, 2011	December 16, 2011	Travel Channel
6	7 + 2 SPs	March 9, 2012	July 20, 2012	Travel Channel
7	18	September 14, 2012	April 19, 2013	Travel Channel
8	11	August 16, 2013	November 15, 2013	Travel Channel
9	13	February 15, 2014	July 12, 2014	Travel Channel
10	11	October 4, 2014	March 7, 2015	Travel Channel
11	11	August 22, 2015	November 7, 2015	Travel Channel
12	13	January 30, 2016	August 6, 2016	Travel Channel
13	11	September 24, 2016	December 31, 2016	Travel Channel
14	11	March 25, 2017	July 15, 2017	Travel Channel
15	11	September 23, 2017	January 13, 2018	Travel Channel
16	9	March 24, 2018	July 14, 2018	Travel Channel
17	6	November 3, 2018	December 8, 2018	Travel Channel
18	6	February 23, 2019	April 26, 2019	Travel Channel
19	7	June 8, 2019	July 20, 2019	Travel Channel
20	3	November 2, 2019	November 16, 2019	Travel Channel / Discovery+
21	12	February 27, 2020	May 14, 2020	Discovery+
22	11	November 5, 2020	April 30, 2021	Discovery+
23	6	July 22, 2021	August 26, 2021	Discovery+
24	8	March 10, 2022	April 28, 2022	Discovery Channel / Discovery+
25	10	September 15, 2022	November 24, 2022	Discovery Channel / Discovery+
26	11	June 7, 2023	August 23, 2023	Discovery Channel / Discovery+
27	5	October 11, 2023	November 8, 2023	Discovery Channel / Discovery+
28	4	May 15, 2024	June 12, 2024	Discovery Channel / Discovery+
29	5	April 23, 2025	May 21, 2025	Discovery Channel / Discovery+
30	10	October 22, 2025	December 31, 2025	Discovery Channel / Discovery+
31	6	September 30, 2026	November 4, 2026	Discovery Channel / Discovery+

== Reception ==
Ghost Adventures (along with Ghost Hunters) also helped popularize paranormal television and ghost hunting during its original run on Travel Channel. The show now airs on Discovery+ as well as Amazon Prime.

=== Controversies ===
Ghost hunting shows and Ghost Adventures in particular, have been accused of fakery. In the Halloween special titled Ghost Adventures Live, which was broadcast from the Trans-Allegheny Lunatic Asylum on October 30, 2009, controversy arose when Robert Bess, inventor of the Parabot Containment Chamber (said to attract and empower spirits using energy, giving them form), claims to have had an EMF meter knocked violently out of his hands. However, upon investigation of the video, it was found that he had actually thrown it. In the November 6, 2009, follow-up Ghost Adventures Live: Post Mortem, hosts Bagans and Groff reviewed the video and concluded that they could not claim any paranormal explanation for the incident.

== Related productions ==
=== Spin-offs ===
==== Ghost Adventures: Aftershocks ====
Ghost Adventures: Aftershocks is a series that premiered on Saturday April 26, 2014, on the Travel Channel. The three season miniseries features Zak Bagans interviewing former Ghost Adventures interviewees to find out how their lives have changed since those GAC "lockdowns"/investigations from the past. Any new audio and/or video evidence that was not shown before, in previous Ghost Adventures episodes, are also revealed.

==== Ghost Adventures: Where Are They Now? ====
Ghost Adventures: Where Are They Now? premiered on Friday August 30, 2019, on the Travel Channel. The series aired as a 5 episode miniseries all under 10 minutes each featuring Zak revisiting some of Ghost Adventures' most chilling paranormal investigations. He follows up with the real people featured on fan-favorite episodes to find out what happened after the crew left.

==== Ghost Adventures: Serial Killer Spirits ====
Ghost Adventures: Serial Killer Spirits premiered on Saturday October 5, 2019, on the Travel Channel. The series aired as a 4 part miniseries featuring Zak and the crew visiting locations across the United States teeming with the dark energies of serial killers.

==== Ghost Adventures: Screaming Room! ====
Ghost Adventures: Screaming Room! premiered on January 2, 2020, on the Travel Channel. There were 13 episodes announced for the first season and second season with Zak, Aaron, Jay and Billy opening up to viewers in their screening room (a.k.a. "screaming room") to watch their favorite episodes.

==== Ghost Adventures: Quarantine ====
Ghost Adventures: Quarantine premiered on June 11, 2020, on the Travel Channel. The series aired as a 4 part miniseries featuring Zak and the crew locked inside his Haunted Museum for 10 days during the 2020 COVID-19 pandemic. The first episode of this miniseries started filming during the start of Nevada state lockdown on March 30. It was titled "Perimeter of Fear" where GAC investigated the Jack Kevorkian van room where women have fainted, the Natalie Wood room and a display of haunted dolls.

==== Ghost Adventures: Top 10 ====
Ghost Adventures: Top 10 premiered on Saturday January 2, 2021, on Discovery+. The series aired as an 8 episode miniseries. Zak Bagans counts down fans' favorite moments from Ghost Adventures. Zak revisits clips from old episodes and presents some of the crew's paranormal evidence.

==== Ghost Adventures: House Calls ====
Ghost Adventures: House Calls premiered on Thursday May 19, 2022, on Discovery+. Zak Bagans investigates the haunted homes of everyday people who are living in terror with nowhere else to turn; Zak and his crew enter each residence armed with equipment to document the unexplained activity.

=== Other ===
==== Paranormal Challenge ====
Paranormal Challenge is a competitive paranormal reality show that premiered on June 17, 2011, on the Travel Channel, with one season aired to date. The show is hosted by Zak Bagans, who challenges ghost hunters from around the United States to go head-to-head in a weekly competition to gather paranormal evidence by spending a night in reportedly haunted locations in the United States.

==== Deadly Possessions ====
Deadly Possessions (also known as Ghost Adventures: Artifacts) is a series that premiered on April 2, 2016, on the Travel Channel. The series aired one season and features Zak Bagans as he gathers artifacts for his new museum in Las Vegas, Nevada. The show reveals the dark history of the items, as well as associated paranormal claims.

==== Demon House ====
Demon House premiered on Friday March 16, 2018, with Lost Footage from the film being released on January 1, 2019, and an Uncut version airing shortly after on February 16, 2019, on the Travel Channel. After buying a haunted home in Indiana over the phone, sight unseen, paranormal investigator Zak Bagans and his crew are unprepared for the demonic forces that await them at the location referred to as a "Portal to Hell."

==== The Haunted Museum ====
The Haunted Museum premiered on Saturday October 2, 2021, on Discovery+. There were 9 episodes announced for the first season. Paranormal investigator and host of Ghost Adventures Zak Bagans joins forces with Eli Roth, noted horror movie maker, to present a film anthology inspired by pieces found in Zak's personal collection of allegedly haunted artifacts.

== Distribution ==
=== International ===
Ghost Adventures is currently on air or streaming in the following countries and channels:

- Australia on TLC, Foxtel Go
- Canada on DTour, Discovery+
- United Kingdom on Discovery+ (2020–present)
- Italy on AXN Sci Fi and DMAX
- Poland on FOKUS TV
- France on Planète+ A&E
- Spain on Discovery and Discovery+
- Germany on A&E Germany
- Netherlands on Spike and Discovery+
- Belgium on Spike
- Czech Republic on Prima ZOOM
- United States on Travel Channel and Max (2023–present)
- India on Discovery+
- Philippines on Travel Channel – Sky Cable and Cignal PH
- South Africa on Travel Channel – DStv
- Thailand on TrueVisions
- New Zealand on TLC
- Norway on Max by Discovery+
- Brazil on Max by Discovery+
- Finland on Kutonen (Finnish TV channel) by Discovery+
- Sweden on HBO Max

== Home media ==
The documentary which the series was based on was released on DVD by Echo Bridge Home Entertainment on October 5, 2010. Season 1 was released on DVD on August 18, 2009, the Season 2 DVD was released on September 14, 2010, Season 3 was released on September 6, 2011, Season 4 on September 4, 2012, and Season 5 on February 24, 2014.

== See also ==
- Ghost hunting
- Ghostlore
- List of ghost films
- Paranormal television
  - Ghost Hunters
  - The Dead Files
  - Destination Fear
  - Kindred Spirits
