= Paranormal Challenge =

Television series

- Also known as: Zak Bagans' Paranormal Challenge
- Genre: Paranormal; Reality television
- Created by: Zak Bagans
- Presented by: Zak Bagans
- Starring: Zak Bagans & Amber Delly
- Opening theme: "Down with the Sickness" by Disturbed
- Country of origin: United States
- Original language: English
- No. of seasons: 1
- No. of episodes: 12

Production
- Executive producers: Zak Bagans; Joe Townley; Michael Yudin
- Producer: Laura Gheradi
- Cinematography: Christian Hoagland
- Editor: Jonathan Rinehart
- Camera setup: Multiple
- Running time: 45 minutes
- Production company: My Tupelo Entertainment

Original release
- Network: Travel Channel
- Release: June 17 – September 16, 2011

Related
- Ghost Adventures

Paranormal Challenge is an American competitive paranormal reality television series that aired from June 17, 2011 to September 16, 2011 on the Travel Channel. A spin-off of Ghost Adventures, the series was created and hosted by lead investigator Zak Bagans, with each episode featuring him challenging two teams of ghost hunters to go head-to-head in a weekly competition to gather paranormal evidence by spending a night in reportedly haunted locations in the United States. The final episode aired on September 16, 2011 and judge David Schrader announced that the show would not be renewed for a second season.

== Judges ==
- Dave Schrader - regular
- Gary Galka - (ep. 1)
- Alexandra Holzer - (ep. 2 & 5)
- Jeff Belanger - (ep. 3)
- Beth Brown - (ep. 3 & 6)
- Mark Constantino - (ep. 4)
- Debby Constantino - (ep. 4)
- Pamela Rae Heath - (ep. 6 & 9)
- Joshua P. Warren - (ep. 5 & 9)
- Bill Chappell - (ep. 7)
- Chris Fleming - (ep. 7 & 12)
- Andrew Nichols - (ep. 8 & 11)
- Ron Fabiani - (ep. 8)
- Michael Shermer - (ep. 10)
- Danielle Harris - (ep. 11)
- Patrick Burns - guest
- Amber Delly - guest

== Series overview ==
No.	Title	Location(s)	Winner	Original release date
1	"Rolling Hills Asylum"	Rolling Hills Asylum, East Bethany, New York	Resident Undead Paranormal	June 17, 2011
In the series premiere Zak pits two teams: Resident Undead Paranormal of Philadelphia, Pennsylvania (boys) versus Paranormal Xpeditions from Massachusetts (girls) against each other to find "paranormal proof" in a haunted asylum the Ghost Adventures Crew (GAC) got locked down in for their investigation.
2	"Eastern State Penitentiary"	Eastern State Penitentiary, Philadelphia, Pennsylvania	Tri-state Paranormal	June 24, 2011
Two teams: Northampton County Paranormal of Bath, Pennsylvania versus Tri-state Paranormal of Metuchen, New Jersey compete to investigate alleged hauntings in prison cells at Eastern State Penitentiary.
3	"Pennhurst State School"	Pennhurst State School and Hospital, Spring City, Pennsylvania	Quest Paranormal Society	July 1, 2011
Two radically different teams investigate Pennhurst State School and Hospital: the methodical investigative approach of the New Jersey Ghost Hunters Society (Rob, L'Aura, Nathan) from Hackettstown, New Jersey, versus the extreme methods of Quest Paranormal Society (Bob, Kenny, Elaine) from Reading, Pennsylvania.
4	"Ohio State Reformatory"	Ohio State Reformatory, Mansfield, Ohio	Steel Town Paranormal	July 8, 2011
Two teams: Steel Town Paranormal (Carrie, Melanie, Chris) from Pittsburgh, Pennsylvania, and Eerie Paranormal (Ben, Gary, Darcy) from Ohio compete for the "best paranormal evidence" in the Ohio State Reformatory, which housed more than 155,000 criminals in the 94 years it was open.
5	"West Virginia Penitentiary"	West Virginia State Penitentiary, Moundsville, West Virginia	Northeastern Spirit Society	July 15, 2011
Two teams: Northeastern Spirit Society of Fairmont, West Virginia and West Virginia Paranormal of Morgantown, West Virginia search for ghosts inside the "Sugar Shack", psych ward, and boiler room in the abandoned West Virginia Penitentiary (aka Moundsville State Penitentiary), which is said to be haunted by an angry former inmate nicknamed the "Baby Raper".
6	"Waverly Hills Sanatorium"	Waverly Hills Sanatorium, Louisville, Kentucky	E.P.I.C. Investigators	July 22, 2011
Two teams: E.P.I.C. Investigators (Theresa, Darla, and Cathi) from Cleveland, Ohio, and Dark Alley Paranormal (Brian, Alex, and Aaron) from Columbus, Ohio, investigate Waverly Hills Sanatorium, an abandoned tuberculosis hospital which documented thousands of deaths during a tuberculosis outbreak in the early 20th century, where high casualties led to the construction of the "body chute".
7	"Trans-Allegheny Lunatic Asylum"	Trans-Allegheny Lunatic Asylum, Weston, West Virginia	Appalachee Paranormal	July 29, 2011
Two teams from West Virginia go head to head: Appalachee Paranormal (Tony, Jeff, and Matt) and G.A.L.S. Paranormal (Ghosts, Apparitions, and Lost Souls) (Jackie, Mandy, and Stacey) investigate the Trans-Allegheny Lunatic Asylum, a former psychiatric hospital that is believed to be one of the country's most haunted sites.
8	"Old South Pittsburg Hospital"	Old South Pittsburg Hospital, South Pittsburg, Tennessee	Tennessee Wraith Chasers	August 12, 2011
Two teams: O.P.S. (Office of Paranormal Studies) (Salina, Debbie, Brandon) from Chattanooga, Tennessee, and Tennessee Wraith Chasers (Doogie, Chris, Porter) from Gallatin, Tennessee, investigate an abandoned hospital that's believed to be one of the most haunted locations in the South.
9	"La Purisima"	La Purisima Mission, Lompoc, California	Paranormal Hot Squad	August 19, 2011
Two paranormal teams from Los Angeles: Ghost Bros. (Joe, Greg, Trevor) and the all-woman team of Paranormal Hot Squad (Jodie, Jesslyn, Camryn) investigate alleged spirits of the Chumash tribe at La Purisima Mission where a bloody Indian uprising occurred in 1824.
10	"Linda Vista Hospital"	Linda Vista Community Hospital, Los Angeles, California	Paranormal EXP	August 26, 2011
Two local paranormal teams Paranormal EXP & Verify Paranormal investigate the abandoned Linda Vista Hospital in gang-territory L.A.
11	"USS Hornet"	USS Hornet, Alameda, California	Soul Seekers	September 9, 2011
Two Paranormal teams: Soul Seekers of Temecula, California (Dante Reeder, Allan Williams & Josh Baker) & S.R.I.P (Spirit Realm Investigative Project) of Denver, Colorado investigate the USS Hornet (WWII United States Navy aircraft carrier) in Alameda, California, which is said to be haunted.
12	"Jerome Grand Hotel"	Jerome Grand Hotel, Jerome, Arizona	Living Proof of the Paranormal	September 16, 2011
Two teams, S.A.G.A.P.S and "Living Proof of the Paranormal" (Krystal Leandra now with Ghost Girl Diaries, Aaron Oakes, and Gerson) from Denver Colorado, hunt for ghosts in the Jerome Grand Hotel in Jerome, Arizona.

== See also ==
- Ghost Adventures
- Ghost hunting
- List of prizes for evidence of the paranormal
- One Million Dollar Paranormal Challenge
- Paranormal television
