= Zak Bagans =

American paranormal investigator

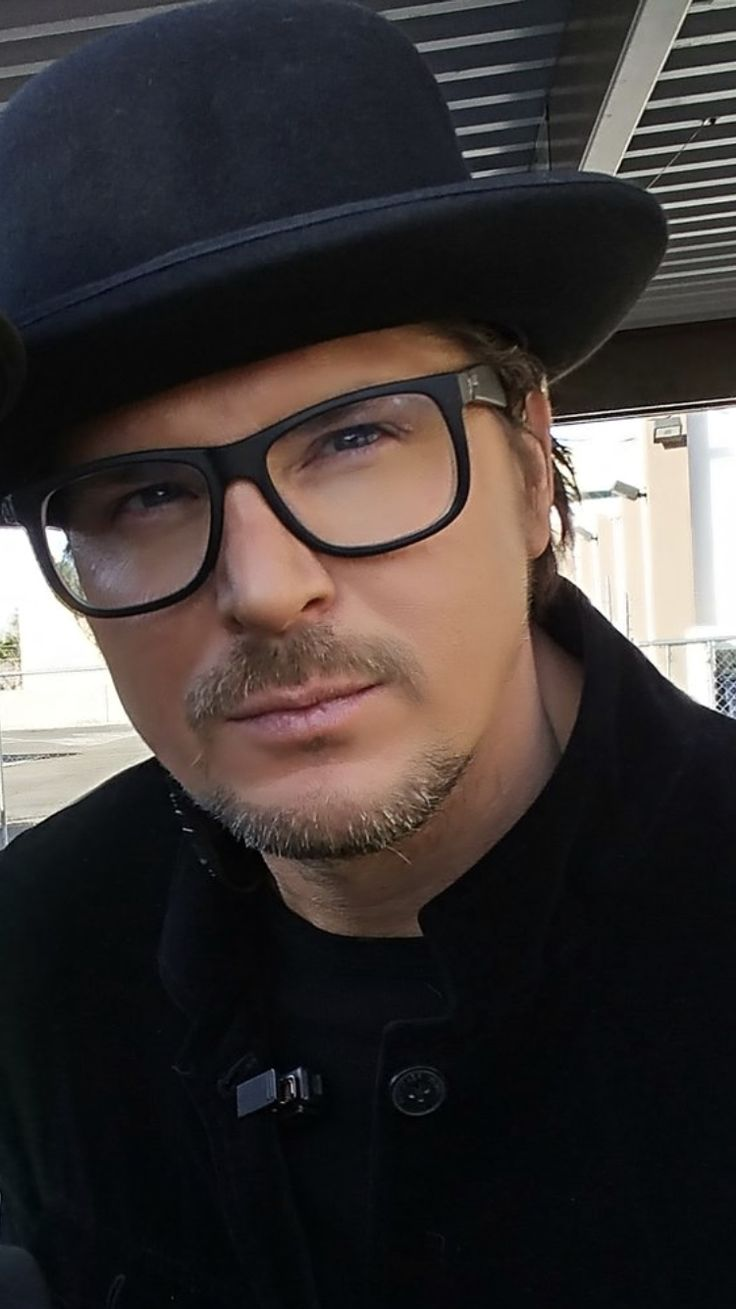
- Bagans in 2018
- Born: Zachary Alexander Bagans; April 5, 1977 (age 49); Washington, D.C., U.S.
- Occupation: Paranormal investigator
- Years active: 2004–present

Zachary "Zak" Alexander Bagans (/ˈbeɪɡənz/ BAY-gənz; born April 5, 1977) is an American paranormal investigator, television personality, museum operator, and author. He is the principal host of the Travel Channel series Ghost Adventures.

== Early life ==
Bagans was born in Washington, D.C., and raised in Glen Ellyn, Illinois. He graduated from Glenbard West High School.

== Career ==
=== Ghost Adventures ===
In 2004, Bagans teamed up with Nick Groff and Aaron Goodwin to produce a documentary-style film called Ghost Adventures. The film aired on the Sci-Fi Channel in 2007. A successor series premiered in 2008 on the Travel Channel and has aired for 19 seasons as of 2019. Ghost hunting shows in general, and Ghost Adventures in particular, have been accused of fakery.

One of Bagans' more notable claims from the show is his alleged communication with deceased actor David Strickland of NBC's Suddenly Susan. Strickland committed suicide at the Oasis Motel in Las Vegas in 1999. Bagans claims to have recorded Strickland's voice nearly a decade following his death, and included this recording in a track on the album NecroFusion. No known scientific analysis has been attempted on the raw recording, including any comparison of the voice heard on the Electronic Voice Phenomena recording to that of the famous actor.

=== Museum ===
On April 2, 2016, Deadly Possessions premiered on the Travel Channel; the show featured Bagans finding items for a prospective "haunted museum" in Las Vegas, Nevada. The museum opened to the public in October 2017. It consists of 33 rooms with various artifacts on display. Visitors are given guided tours of the rooms. Some of the items on display include Bela Lugosi's mirror, the Dybbuk box, Peggy the Doll, and Jack Kevorkian's "Death Van". Some of the claims attached to the artifacts have been criticized. Both the Lugosi mirror and Captain Smith mirror kept in the museum have been claimed to have dubious provenance. All visitors must sign waivers before entering indemnifying the museum against “spiritual or paranormal interactions”. On 27 May 2019, an exhibit featuring a rocking chair from The Devil in Connecticut alleged demon possession case was shut down briefly due to a visitor fainting. The exhibit reopened on 7 June.

In 2018, the museum received Las Vegas Mayor's award for historic preservation and adaptive reuse.

In 2021, the transaxle salvaged from the American actor James Dean's Porsche 550 Spyder was added to the museum's collection.

=== The Haunted Museum ===
In May 2021, Discovery+ Channel announced its plans to broadcast The Haunted Museum, an upcoming horror anthology show for which Zak Bagans will be the host and an executive producer. The series will be filmed in Las Vegas, Nevada and Toronto, Canada by the Cream Productions with Eli Roth as a filmmaker and Matt Booi, Kate Harrison Karman and David Brady as executive producers.

=== Books ===
Bagans co-wrote a book with author Kelly Crigger titled Dark World: Into the Shadows with the Lead Investigator of the Ghost Adventures Crew. On September 23, 2011, the book debuted on The New York Times Best Seller list at No. 18.

In December, 2019, Bagans published the book Ghost-Hunting For Dummies. The book "outlining the history of ghost-hunting, including true accounts and stories from Bagans’ famous cases and investigations, and explains how anyone can get started in investigating the supernatural.". Troy Taylor has stated that Bagans and he worked together on researching material for the book. But Taylor also says that Bagans did not have permission to use his original material in the book and that he had received "a substantial payment" from Bagans in a settlement. Writing for Skeptical Inquirer magazine, paranormal investigator Kenny Biddle observes that throughout much of the book Bagans displays a strong bias against skeptics and scientists and also accuses Bagans of plagiarizing others such as Joe Nickell The Skeptical Inquirer and the Society for Psychical Research noted similarities between several passages in the book and those by other writers.

== Personal life ==
Bagans lives in Las Vegas, Nevada. He previously lived in Summerlin, Nevada.

== Filmography ==
Film
Year	Title	Role	Notes
2004	Ghost Adventures	Himself	Documentary
2018	Demon House	Himself	Documentary

Television
Year	Title	Role	Notes
2008–present	Ghost Adventures	Himself, also creator and executive producer	274 episodes and 53 specials
2011	Paranormal Challenge	Himself, also creator and executive producer	12 episodes
2012	Paranormal Paparazzi	Executive producer	8 episodes
2012	Nightline	Himself	Guest
2014–2016	Ghost Adventures: Aftershocks	Himself, also creator and executive producer	25 episodes
2015	The Late Late Show with James Corden	Himself	Guest
2015	Today	Himself	Guest
2016	Deadly Possessions	Himself, also creator and executive producer	6 episodes
2021	Haunted Museum Series	Himself, also creator and executive producer	N/A
2021–2022	Halloween Wars	Himself	Host

== Discography ==
Year	Album details	Chart positions
2012	NecroFusion: Released: 2012; Format: CD	—
