= EMF measurement =

Measurement of ambient electromagnetic field

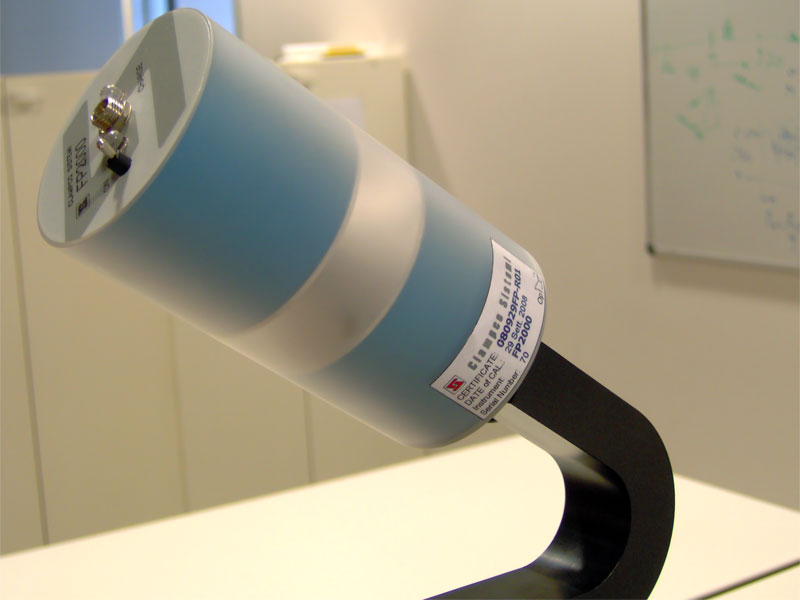
Electric field probe FP2000 (range 100 kHz – 2137 MHz)

EMF measurements are measurements of ambient (surrounding) electromagnetic fields that are performed using particular sensors or probes, such as EMF meters. These probes can be generally considered as antennas although with different characteristics. In fact, probes should not perturb the electromagnetic field and must prevent coupling and reflection as much as possible in order to obtain precise results. There are two main types of EMF measurements:

- broadband measurements: performed using a broadband probe, that is a device which senses any signal across a wide range of frequencies and is usually made with three independent diode detectors;
- frequency selective measurements: in which the measurement system consists of a field antenna and a frequency selective receiver or spectrum analyzer allowing to monitor the frequency range of interest.

EMF probes may respond to fields only on one axis, or may be tri-axial, showing components of the field in three directions at once. Amplified, active, probes can improve measurement precision and sensitivity but their active components may limit their speed of response.

== Ideal isotropic measurements ==
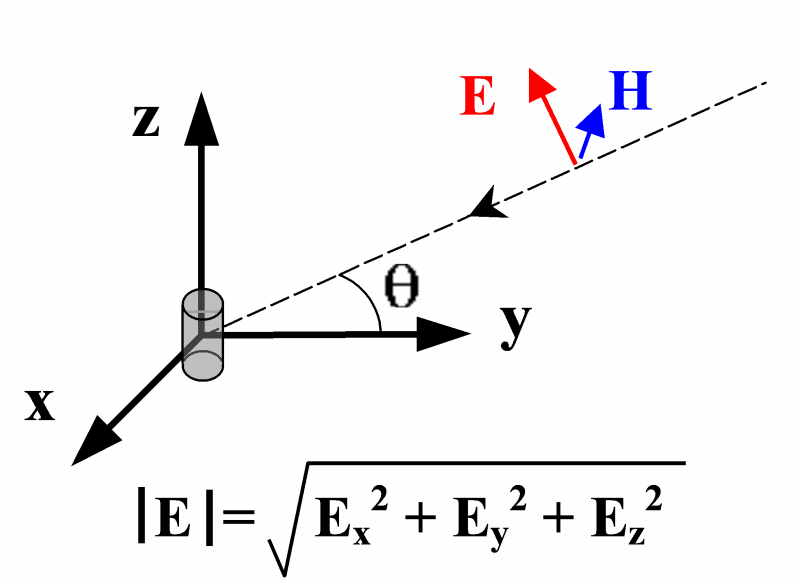
E-field projections on an orthogonal reference frame

Measurements of the EMF are obtained using an E-field sensor or H-field sensor which can be isotropic or mono-axial, active or passive. A mono-axial, omnidirectional probe is a device which senses the Electric (short dipole) or Magnetic field linearly polarized in a given direction.

Using a mono-axial probe implies the need for three measurements taken with the sensor axis set up along three mutually orthogonal directions, in a X, Y, Z configuration. As an example, it can be used as a probe which senses the Electric field component parallel to the direction of its axis of symmetry. In these conditions, where E is the amplitude of incident electric field, and θ is the amplitude of the angle between sensor axis and direction of electric field E, the signal detected is proportional to |E|cos θ (right). This allows obtainment of the correct total amplitude of the field in the form of

$$|E|= \sqrt{E_x^2+E_y^2+E_z^2}$$

or, in case of the magnetic field

$$|H|= \sqrt{H_x^2+H_y^2+H_z^2}$$

An isotropic (tri-axial) probe simplifies the measurement procedure because the total field value is determined with three measures taken without changing sensor position: this results from the geometry of the device which is made by three independent broadband sensing elements placed orthogonal to each other. In practice, each element's output is measured in three consecutive time intervals supposing field components being time stationary .

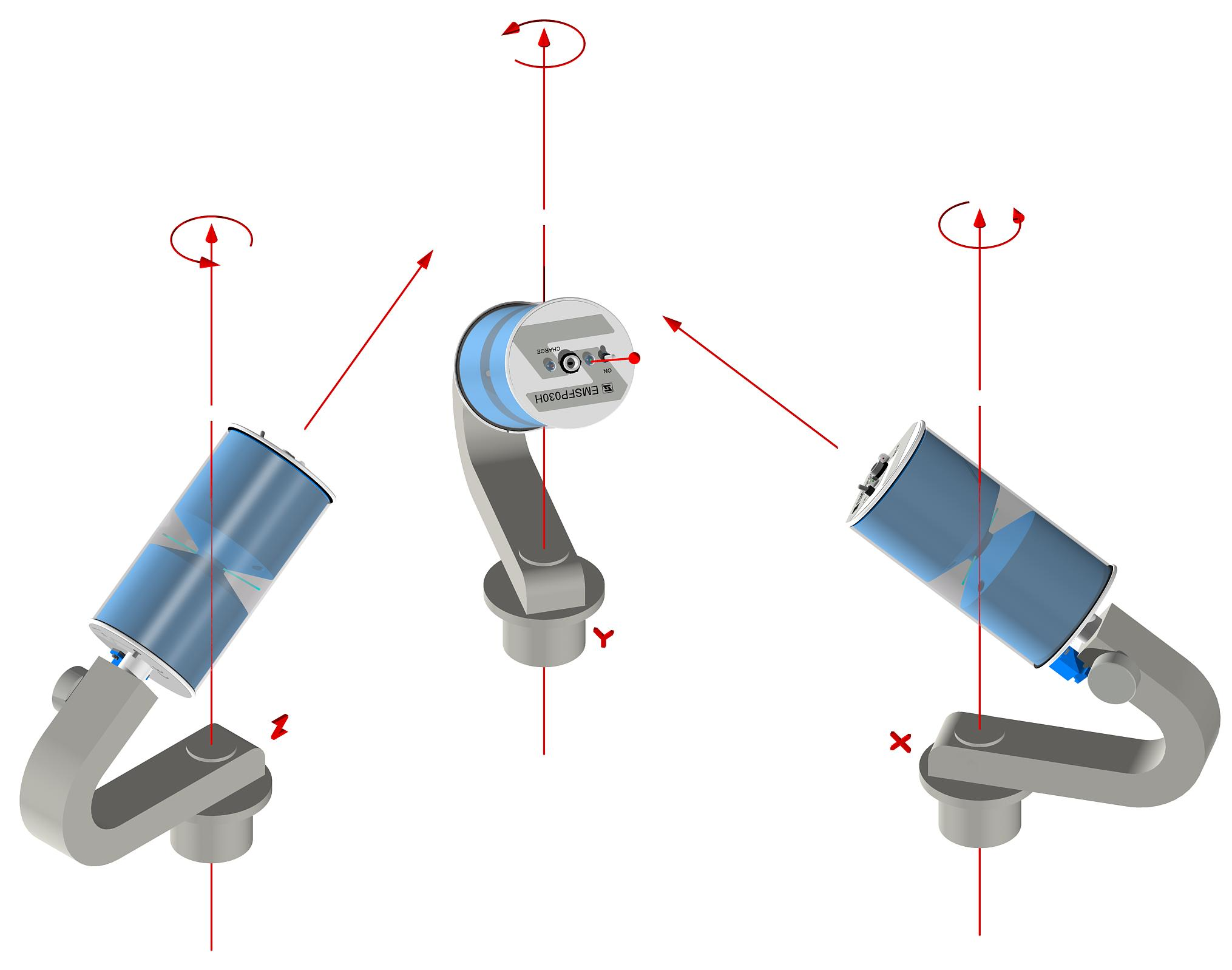

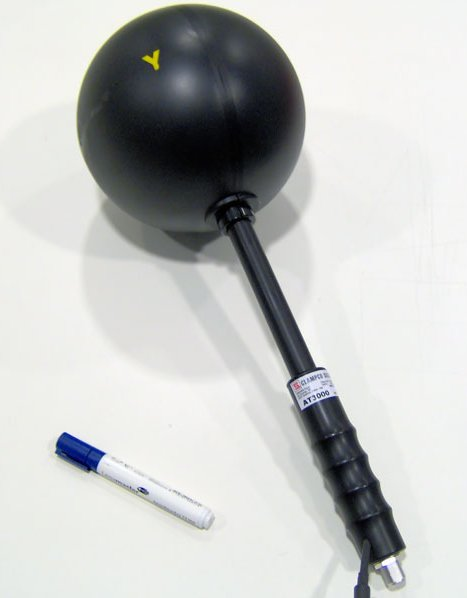
Isotropic antenna AT3000 (passive probe, 20 MHz – 3000 MHz)

== Meters ==
An EMF meter is a scientific instrument for measuring electromagnetic fields (abbreviated as EMF). Most meters measure the electromagnetic radiation flux density (DC fields) or the change in an electromagnetic field over time (AC fields), essentially the same as a radio antenna, but with quite different detection characteristics.

The two largest categories are single axis and tri-axis. Single axis meters are cheaper than tri-axis meters, but take longer to complete a survey because the meter only measures one dimension of the field. Single axis instruments have to be tilted and turned on all three axes to obtain a full measurement. A tri-axis meter measures all three axes simultaneously, but these models tend to be more expensive.

Electromagnetic fields can be generated by alternating or direct currents. An EMF meter can measure AC electromagnetic fields, which are usually emitted from man-made sources such as electrical wiring, while gaussmeters or magnetometers measure DC fields, which occur naturally in Earth's geomagnetic field and are emitted from other sources where direct current is present.

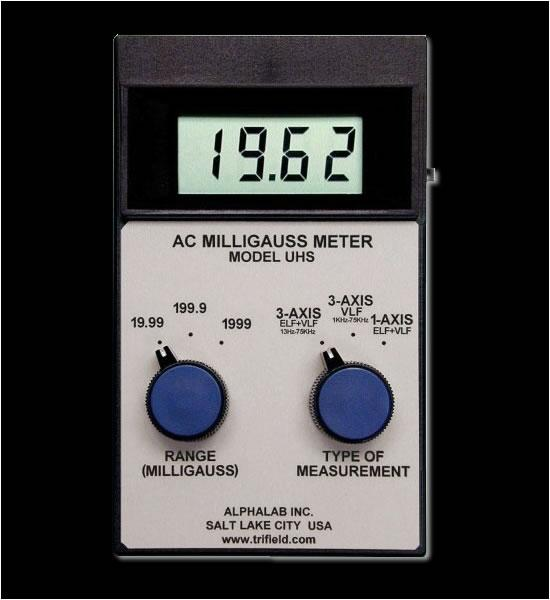
An example of an EMF meter.

=== Sensitivity and calibration ===
As most electromagnetic fields encountered in everyday situations are those generated by household or industrial appliances, the majority of EMF meters available are calibrated to measure 50 and 60 Hz alternating fields (the frequency of European and US mains electricity). There are other meters which can measure fields alternating at as low as 20 Hz, however these tend to be much more expensive and are only used for specific research purposes.

== Active and passive sensors ==
Active sensors are sensing devices which contain active components; usually this solution allows for a more precise measurement with respect to passive components. In fact, a passive receiving antenna collects energy from the electromagnetic field being measured and makes it available at a RF cable connector. This signal then goes to the spectrum analyzer but the field characteristics can be someway modified by the presence of the cable, especially in near-field conditions.

On the other hand, an effective solution is to transfer on an optical carrier, the electric (or magnetic) field component sensed with an active probe. The basic components of the system are a receiving electro-optical antenna which is able to transfer, on an optical carrier, the individual electric (or magnetic) field component picked up and to return it in the form of an electrical signal at the output port of an opto-electric converter.

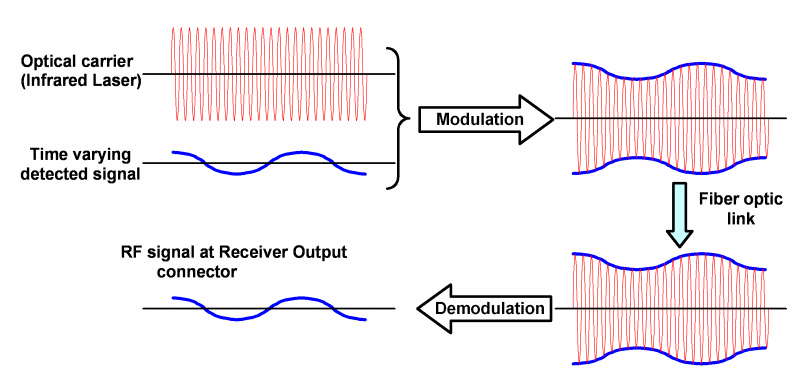

The modulated optical carrier is transferred by means of a fiber-optic link to a converter which extracts the modulating signal and converts it back to an electrical signal. The electrical signal thus obtained can be then sent to a spectrum analyzer with a 50 Ω common RF cable.

== Isotropic deviation ==
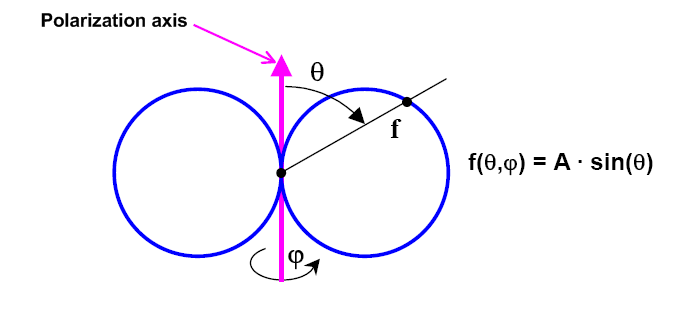
Short dipole radiation pattern

Isotropic deviation, in EMF measurements, is a parameter that describes the accuracy in measuring field intensities irrespective of the probe's orientation. If the field is obtained by three measurements in an orthogonal X, Y, Z configuration in the form:

$$|E|= \sqrt{E_x^2+E_y^2+E_z^2}$$

a sufficient condition for the expression to be true for every three orthogonal coordinates (X,Y,Z) is for the probe radiation pattern to be as close as possible to ideal short dipole pattern, called sin θ:

$$f(\theta, \phi)= A \sin(\theta),$$

where A is function of frequency. The difference between ideal dipole radiation pattern and real probe pattern is called isotropic deviation.
