= Joseph Upatham School =

- โรงเรียนยอแซฟอุปถัมภ์

Location
- 2 Moo 6 Phetkasem Rd. Takham; Sam Phran, Nakhon Pathom Province, 73110; Thailand
- Coordinates: 13.721411°N 100.258246°E

Information
- School type: Private school
- Motto: Latin: Ora et Labora (Pray and work)
- Religious affiliation: Roman Catholicism
- Established: March 3, 1965; 61 years ago
- Founder: Archbishop Joseph Khiamsun Nittayo
- School district: Sam Phran District
- Oversight: Roman Catholic Archdiocese of Bangkok
- Director: Rev.Fr. John Bosco Suchat Udomsittipattana(since 2019)
- Patron saint: Saint Joseph
- Faculty: 600
- Grades: 1–12
- Enrollment: 7,300
- Average class size: 50
- Language: The languages taught in school (Thailand) Thai (United Kingdom) English (China) Mandarin Chinese (Vatican City) Latin (for Catholic novices)
- Hours in school day: 08:00–17:00
- Campus type: suburb
- Colors: Green and yellow
- Song: Thai: March Joseph; Latin: Joseph Concelebremus
- Publication: JS News / JS Lady News
- Yearbook: Tuberose (ซ่อนกลิ่น)
- Website: http://www.joseph.ac.th

Joseph Upatham School (Thai: โรงเรียนยอแซฟอุปถัมภ์), sometimes called "Joseph Upatham School Samphran" (Thai: โรงเรียนยอแซฟอุปถัมภ์ สามพราน) and abbreviated as JS (Thai: ยอ.)), is a private Catholic school in Nakhon Pathom, Thailand under the Education Department of the Archdiocese of Bangkok. Managed by the Archbishop and Pastor of the Archdiocese of Bangkok, the Sisters of the Sacred Heart of Jesus and the Sisters of Saint Paul of Chartres.

- Founder: Archbishop Joseph Khiamsun Nittayo
- Co-Founder: Rev. Francis Xavier Thongdee Kitcharaen
- Licensee: Cardinal Michael Michai Kitbunchu

The sub district of Tha Kham (usually written Takham), is the heartland of the Roman Catholic Christian religion in Thailand. Michael Michai Kitbunchu, Cardinal of Thailand was born in Sam Phran and many Catholic religious institutes have their convents, monasteries and headquarters in the area and there is also Thailand's major seminary. The largest and most important installation in the Catholic enclave of Tha Kham, (and also in Sam Phran), is the vast campus shared by Joseph Upatham School one of the largest combined kindergarten, primary and secondary schools in the country, the main institution of the 43 schools and colleges governed by the Education Department of Bangkok Archdiocese (EDBA), and the Ban Phu Waan Pastoral Training Centre - a leading Catholic conference and convention centre in Asia. There are several other large private schools in Takham including St. Peter's school (mixed gender, kindergarten and Grades 1 to 9) also governed by the EDBA in the parish of St. Peter, a village and factory community about 2 kilometres from the main highway in the south of Tha Kham, and Marie Upatham, an independent Catholic school for girls in the Takham village of Mor Sii.

== Name ==
"Joseph" is the name of the patron saint of Archbishop Joseph Khiamsun Nittayo and "Upatham" in the Thai Language means foster. When combined, "Joseph Upatham" means "was fostered by St. Joseph".

== Relations with the Holy See ==
- 1987: Pope John Paul II presided the celebration of a Mass for Thanksgiving with 23 new priests' concelebrating with him at the closing of the sacred year for Thailand at Joseph Upatham School.
- 2004: Pope Benedict XVI sent a congratulatory plaque to Joseph Upatham School on the occasion of the school's 40th anniversary.

== Notable alumni ==
- Cardinal Francis Xavier Kriengsak Kovitvanit, Bishop of Nakhon Sawan (7 March 2007 – 14 May 2009) and Archbishop of Bangkok (14 May 2009–present)
- Bishop Francis Xavier Vira Arpondratana, Bishop of Chiang Mai (10 February 2009 – present)

== Rector of Joseph Upatham School ==
Saint Joseph Seminary

Years in office	Name
1965	Rev.Fr. Francis Xavier Thongdee Kitcharoen
1965-1973	Rev.Fr. Michael Huashang Kitbunchu; Archbishop of Bangkok(1972-2009)now is archbishop emeritus Cardinal Protopriest(2016–present)
1973-1976	Rev.Fr. Joseph Sangval Surasarang; Bishop of Chiang Mai(1987-2009) now is bishop emeritus
1976-1983	Rev.Fr. Joseph Pravit Phongviratchai
1983-1992	Rev.Fr. Joseph Pibul Visitnondachai; Bishop of Nakhon Sawan(2009–present)
1992-1996	Rev.Fr. Peter Surasit Chumsriphan
1992-1999	Rev.Fr. John Suthep Phongviratchai
1999-2004	Rev.Fr. Ignatius Adisak Somsaengsuang
2004-2009	Rev.Fr. John Witchukorn Gatepab
2009-2013	Rev.Fr. Joseph Prateep Kiratipong
2013-2019	Rev.Fr. Joseph Chaiyo Kitsakul
2019–present	Rev.Fr. Joseph Vittaya Ladloi

The Ascension Catholic Church

Years in office	Name
2006–present	Rev.Fr. Peter Chatchaval Supalak

== Manager of Joseph Upatham School ==
School's Directors

Years in office	Name
1966-1967	Rev.Fr. Joseph Savieng Surasarang
1967-1974	Rev.Fr. Muchael Khomthun Mungsommai
1974-1981	Rev.Fr. Joseph Virasak Vanarotsuvit
1981-1984	Rev.Fr. Charles Piya Rotchanamarivong(Boonleang Sae-Pang)
1984-1989	Rev.Fr. Peter Chavalit Kitcharoen
1989-1990	Rev.Fr. John Baptit Vivat Praesiri
1990-1994	Rev.Fr. Joseph Vuthilert Haelom
1994-1999	Rev.Fr. Joseph Suphakij Lertjitleakha(Sae-Lee)
1999-2006	Rev.Fr. Nicolas Sakchai Saphaphamai
2006-2013	Rev.Fr. John Baptist Ekaporn Nittayo
2013-2016	Rev.Fr. Peter Theeraphol Kobvithayakul
2016-2017	Rev.Fr. Paul Sawong Wijitwong
2017-2019	Rev.Fr. Joseph Itthipon Srirattana
2019–present	Rev.Fr. John Bosco Suchat Udomsittipattana

Headmaster of School's College

Years in office	Name
2006-2013	Rev.Fr. Emmanuel Sahaphon Tangthavorn
2013-2016	Rev.Fr. Paul Sawong Wijitwong
2016–present	Rev.Fr. Stefen Weerayuth Kieatsakulchai

Headmistress of School's Convent

Years in office	Name
2006-2010	Sr.Kristoff Paykanan
2010-2011	Sr.Thérèse de Lisieux Wongcheun
2011-2015	Sr.Margaret Jittree Rattanawongchaiya
2015-2018	Sr.Jeanne-Françoise de Chantal Suphen Triwaudom
2018-2019	Sr.Jeanne-Baptiste Kanjana Sudprasert

== Curriculum ==
- Primary Education (Grade 1-6 according to Thai Education)

1.Intensive English Course
2.English Programme
3.Ordinary Programme

- Junior High School Education (Grade 7-9 according to Thai Education)

1.Intensive English Course
2.English Programme
3.Ordinary Programme
4.Science-Mathematics Programme

- Senior High School Education (Grade 10-12 according to Thai Education)

Majors	Minors
Science–Mathematics	English
English–Mathematics	Science-Social Studies
English	Thai-Social Studies
English–Chinese	Thai-Social Studies
English–Social Studies	Thai-Computer, Career
