= Holy Redeemer Church, Bangkok =

Holy Redeemer Church
- วัดพระมหาไถ่
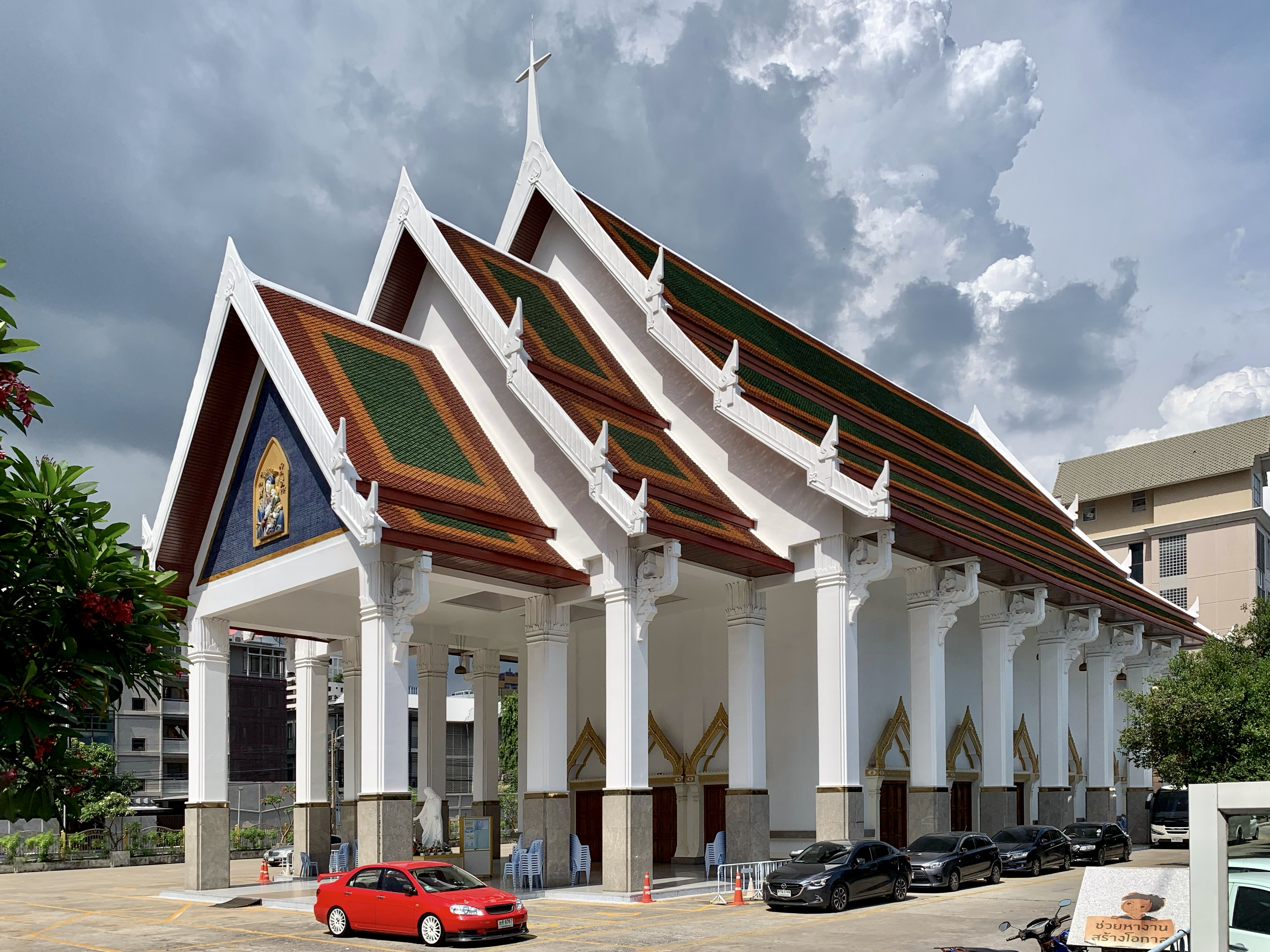
- Holy Redeemer Church in 2021
- Holy Redeemer Church
- 13.734739°N 100.548870°E
- Location: Ruamrudee Lane; Witthayu Rd; Pathum Wan District, Bangkok 10330
- Country: Thailand
- Denomination: Catholic
- Website: www.holyredeemerbangkok.org

History
- Status: Parish church
- Founded: 1949
- Founder: Congregation of the Most Holy Redeemer

Architecture
- Functional status: Active
- Style: Thai

Administration
- Archdiocese: Bangkok

Clergy
- Pastor: Rev. Joseph Prud Thipthong C.Ss.R.

Holy Redeemer Church (Thai: วัดพระมหาไถ่; RTGS: wat phra mahathai) in Bangkok, Thailand is a Catholic church established by the Congregation of the Most Holy Redeemer (also known as the Redemptorists). It is part of the Archdiocese of Bangkok, part of the province of Thailand.

== Location ==
The church is located in Soi Ruamrudee, off Phloen Chit BTS Station, close to the foreign embassy district in the city.

== Liturgy ==
The church celebrates mass daily with separate services in Thai and English. The musical elements of the services are provided by an electronic organ and the participation of the congregation.

== History ==
The Parish of Holy Redeemer was established by the Redemptorists in 1949, with the church itself being built in 1954. It is built in the traditional Thai architectural style.

== Community ==
Its location in the city lends itself to a large congregation catering to local and international parishioners from many different cultures and walks of life. It also draws many of its congregation from the Klong Toey slums.

=== Schools ===
The Redemptorists, with the support of expatriate parishioners, founded the Ruamrudee International School in 1957. The school is now located in Minburi and has grown to have a student population of approximately 1,300. It grew from the original Thai-medium school, Holy Redeemer School, which remains on the parish property. Ruamrudee follows the American curriculum and uses English as its medium of instruction while Holy Redeemer follows the local curriculum.

=== Marriage preparation ===
The parish has a well-established marriage preparation program (Pre-Cana instruction) and serves as the main centre for Catholic parishes in Bangkok to send couples for marriage preparation.

=== Food outreach program ===
The church supports a Food Outreach Program that aims to help people who are asylum seekers, mostly from Pakistan with others from Sri Lanka, Palestine and Syria. Started in 2009, it now supports more than 400 families each month

=== Social outreach ===
The Thailand Redemptorists have also developed numerous other community-based programs or institutions, including:

- Sarnelli House Thailand, an orphanage for children who have been abandoned or who have HIV/AIDS
- Human Development Foundation Mercy Centre, a "shelter for street kids, five orphanages, a hospice, a home for mothers and children with HIV/AIDS, a 400-pupil kindergarten, a community meeting place, and a serene haven in the slums with small gardens and playgrounds
- Father Ray Foundation, an organisation that cares for "orphaned, abused and disadvantaged children and students with disabilities

=== Community services ===
- Overeaters Anonymous, a support group for overeaters, particularly expats in Bangkok
- Alcoholics Anonymous meeting place

== Gallery ==
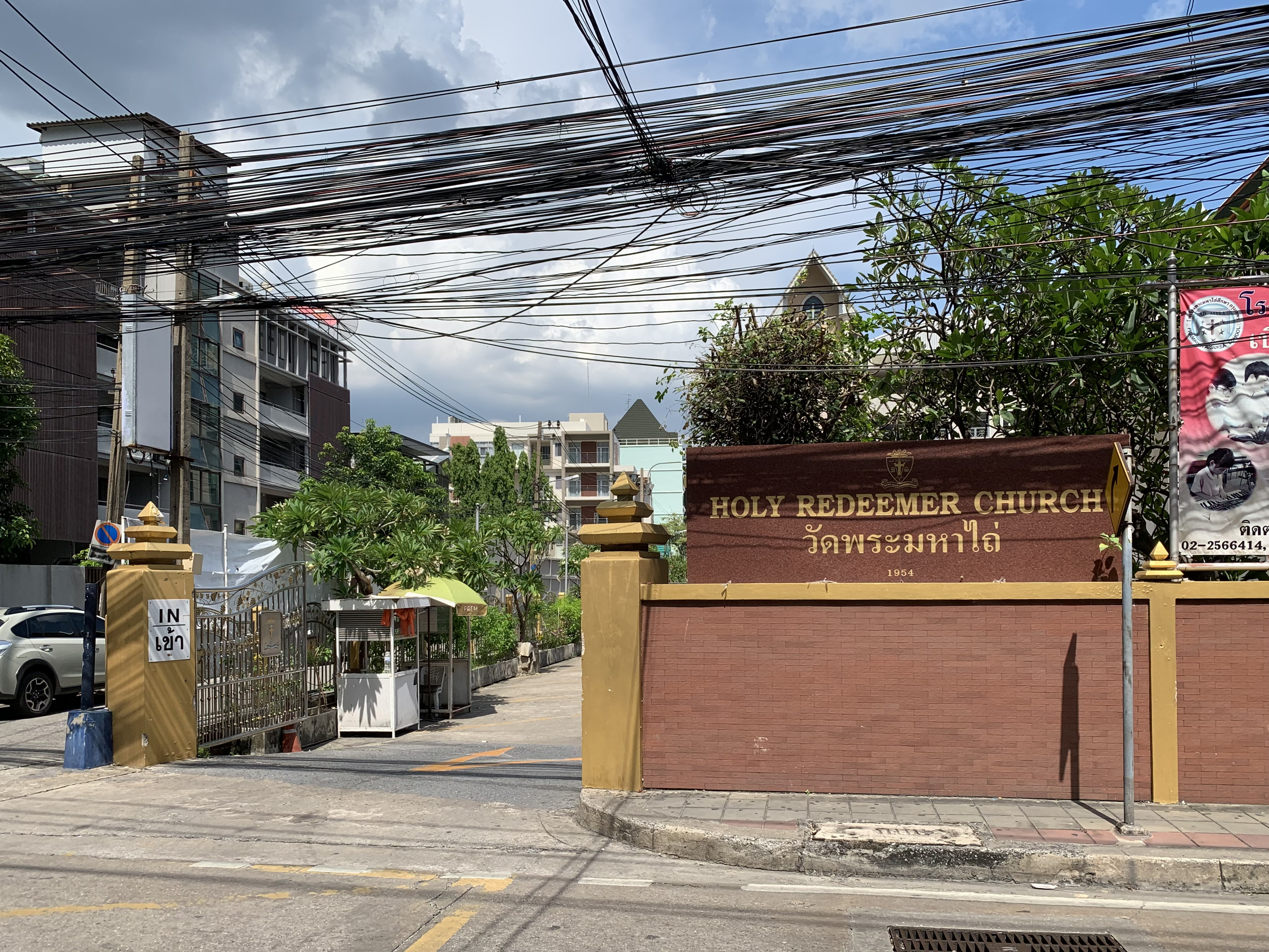

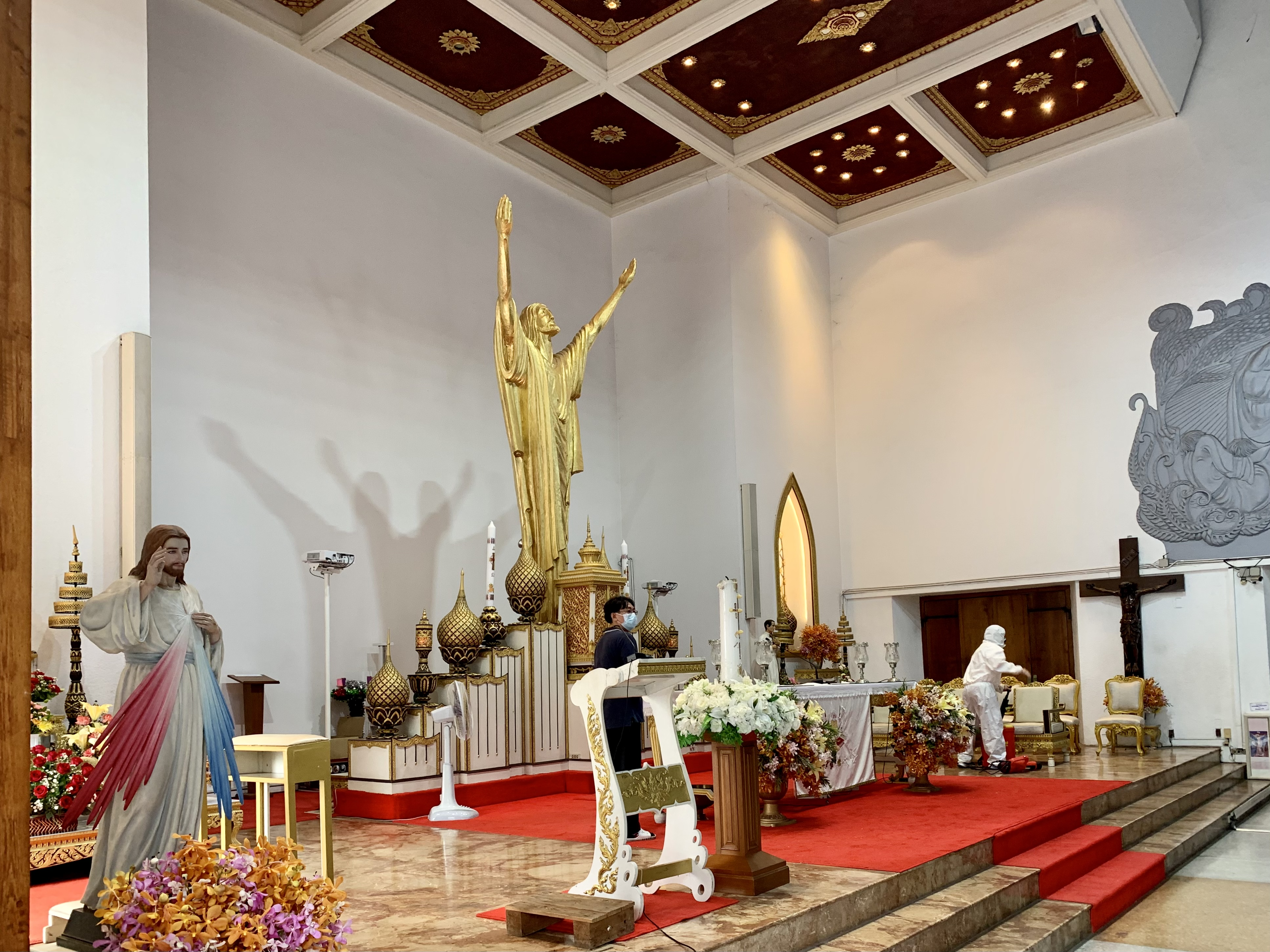

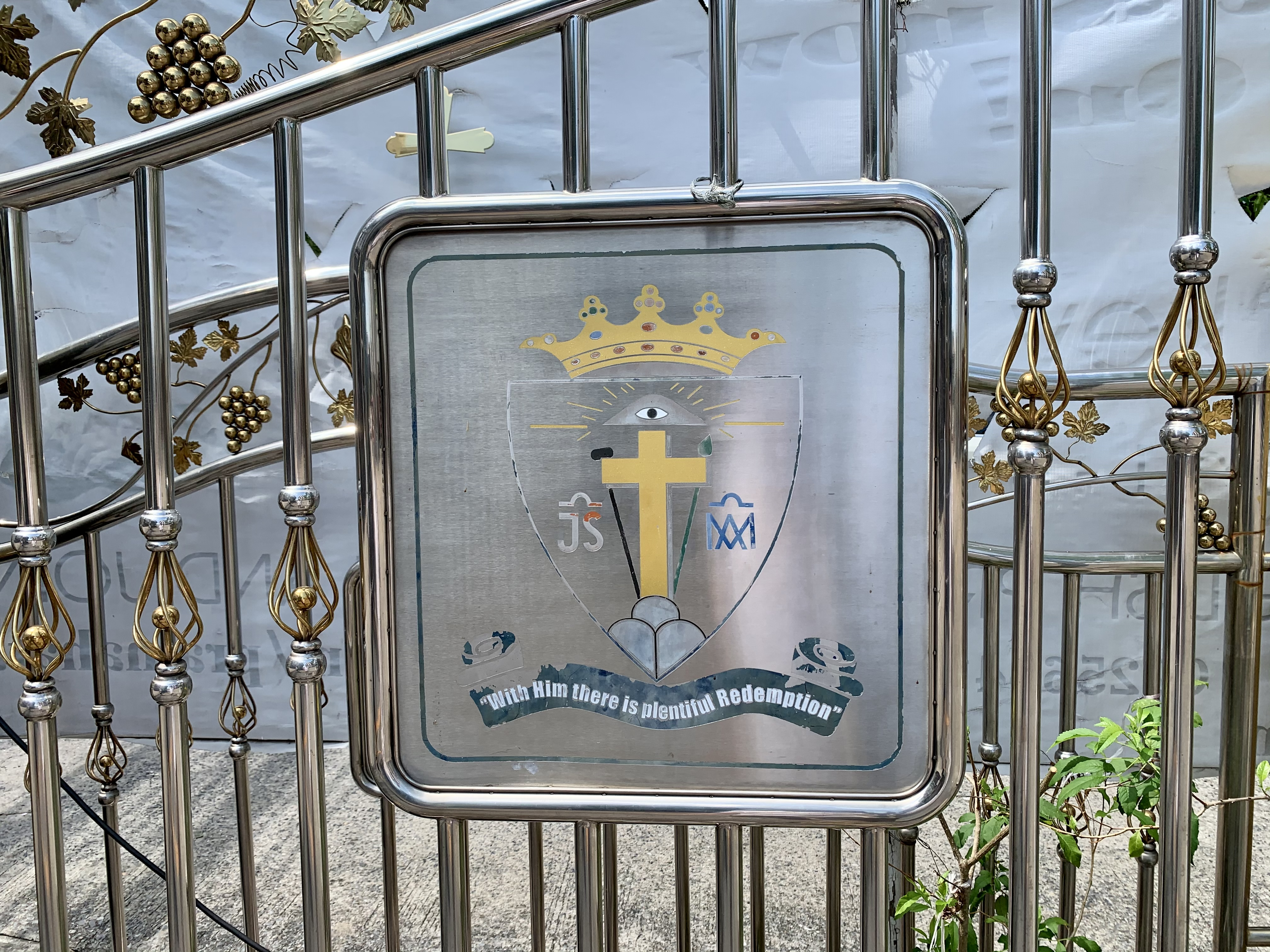

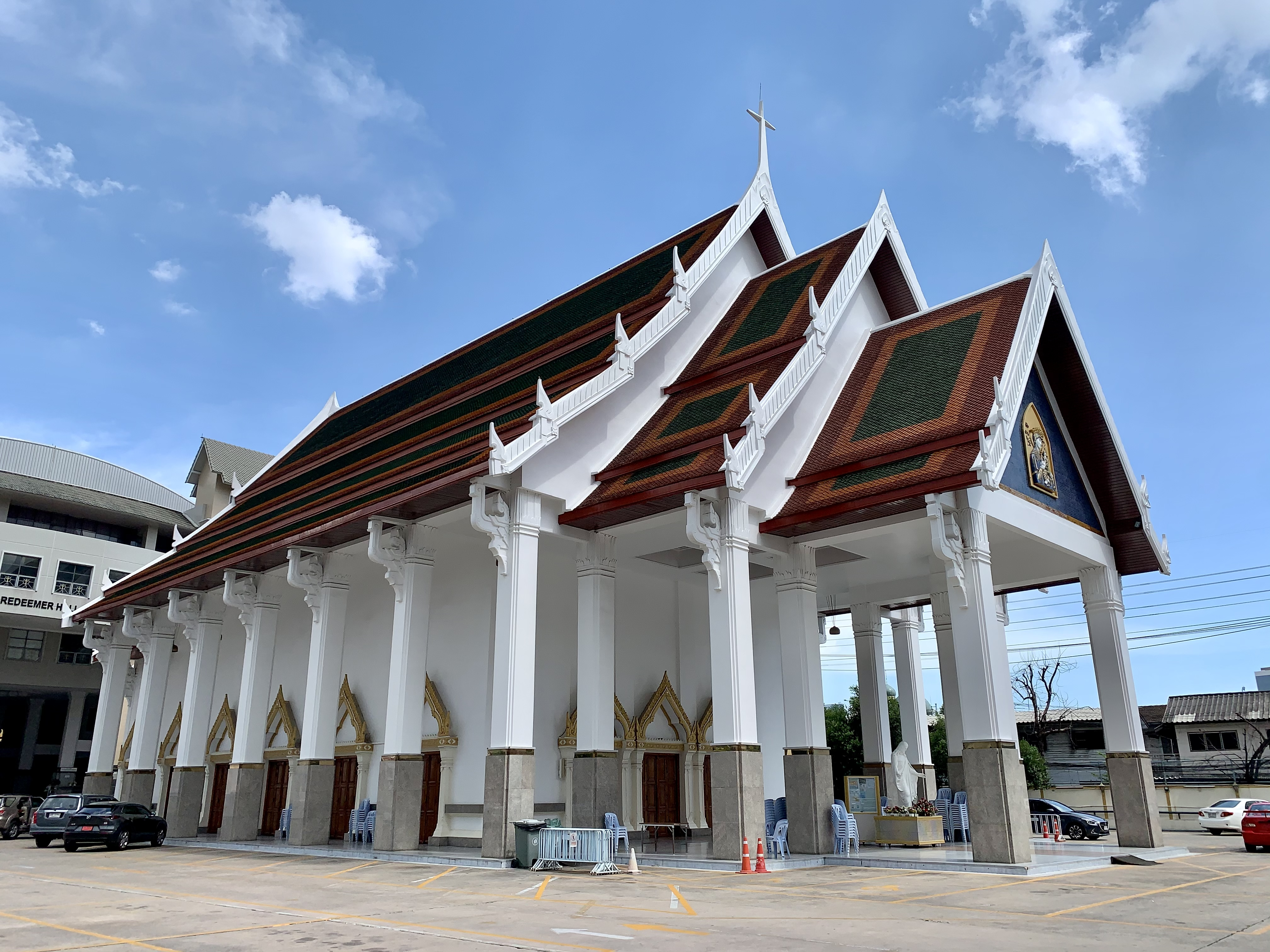

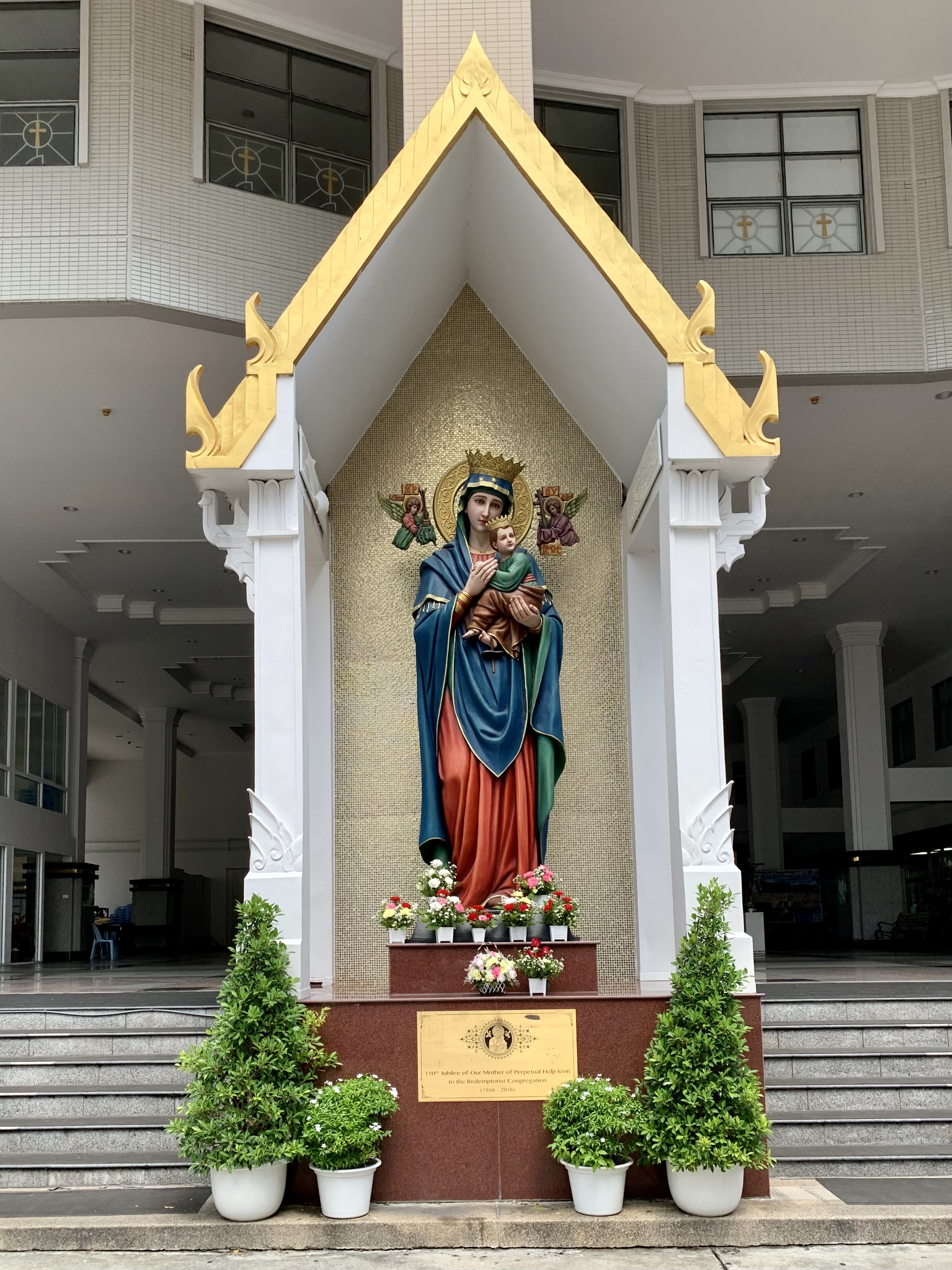

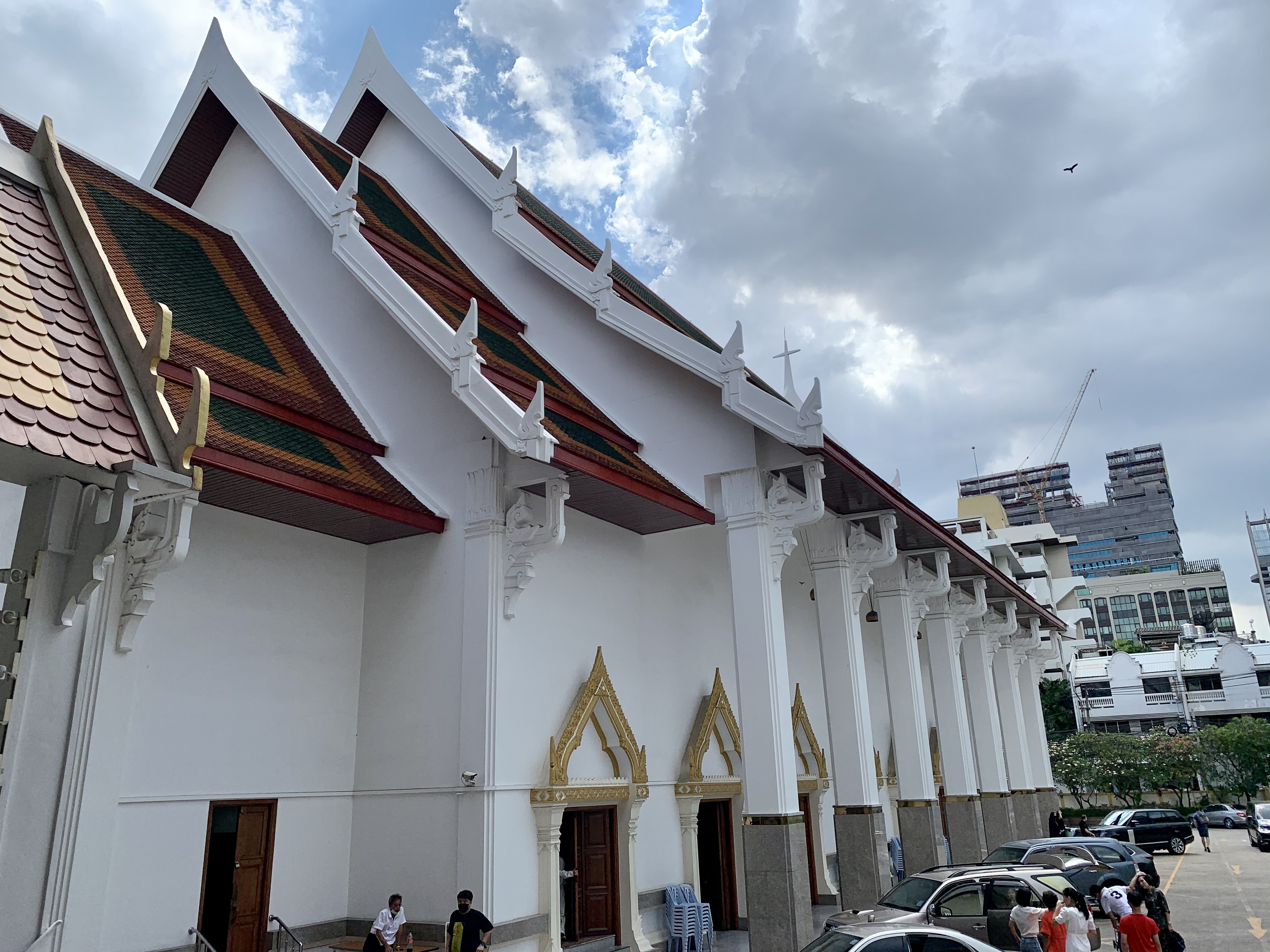

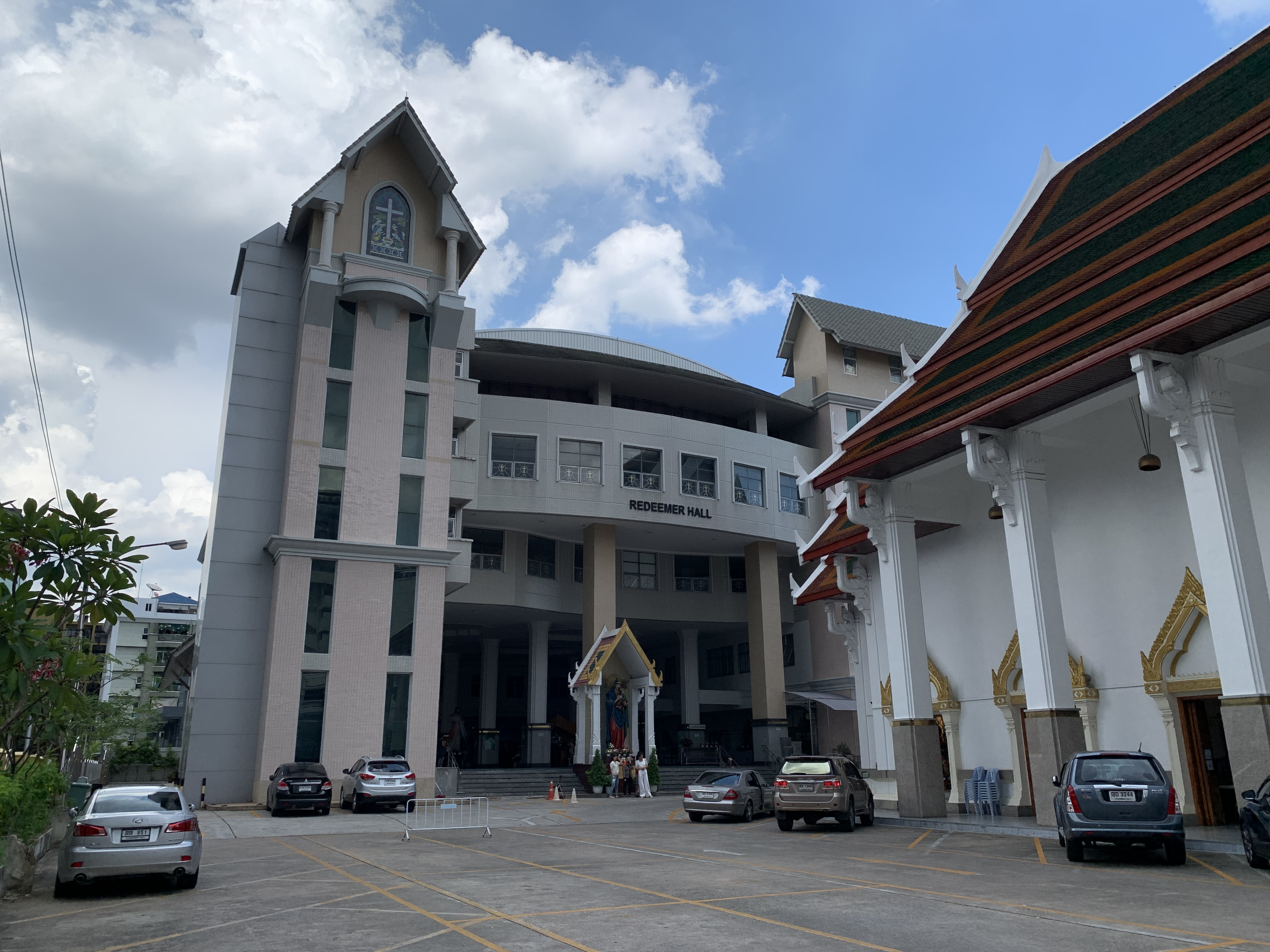

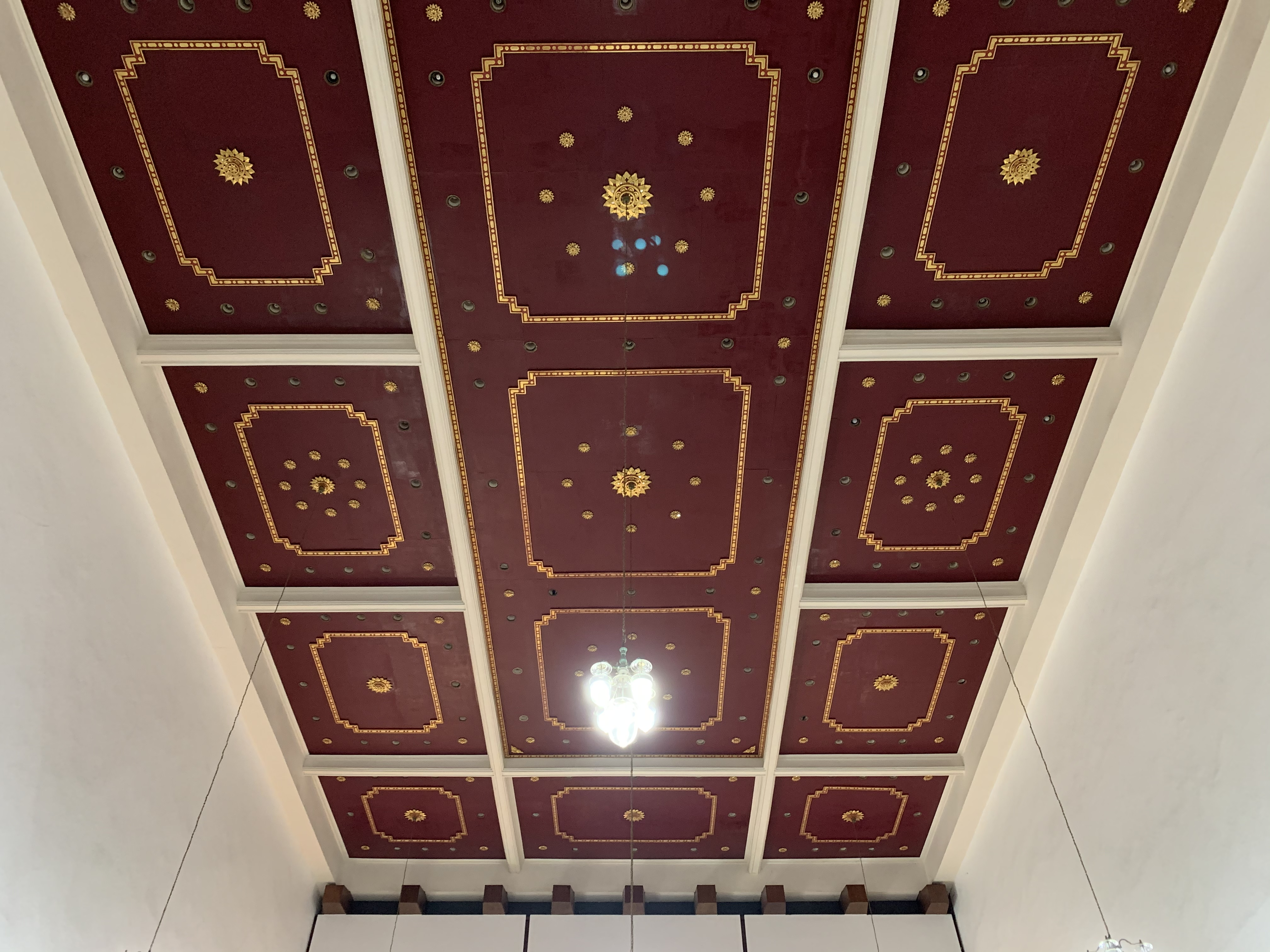

== See also ==
- Ruamrudee International School – founded by Redemptorist priests from the church
- Catholic Church in Thailand
- Christianity in Thailand
- List of Catholic dioceses in Thailand
- Archdiocese of Bangkok
- Catholic Mission of Bangkok (LiCAS.news)
- Wat Niwet Thammaprawat – a Thai Buddhist temple built in Christian Gothic Revival style
