= List of Catholic dioceses in Thailand =

The Episcopal Conference of Thailand is composed of 2 ecclesiastical provinces, each headed by an archbishop, and 9 suffragan dioceses.

== Episcopal Conference of Thailand ==
=== Ecclesiastical Province of Bangkok ===
- Archdiocese of Bangkok
  - Diocese of Chanthaburi
  - Diocese of Chiang Mai
  - Diocese of Chiang Rai
  - Diocese of Nakhon Sawan
  - Diocese of Ratchaburi
  - Diocese of Surat Thani

=== Ecclesiastical Province of Thare and Nonseng ===
- Archdiocese of Thare and Nonseng
  - Diocese of Nakhon Ratchasima
  - Diocese of Ubon Ratchathani
  - Diocese of Udon Thani

== See also ==
- Christianity in Thailand
- Catholic Church in Thailand
- List of Catholic dioceses (structured view)#Episcopal Conference of Thailand
