= Kriengsak Kovitvanit =

Thai Catholic prelate and cardinal

His Eminence Francis Xavier Kriengsak Kovitvanij
- Cardinal, Archbishop Emeritus of Bangkok
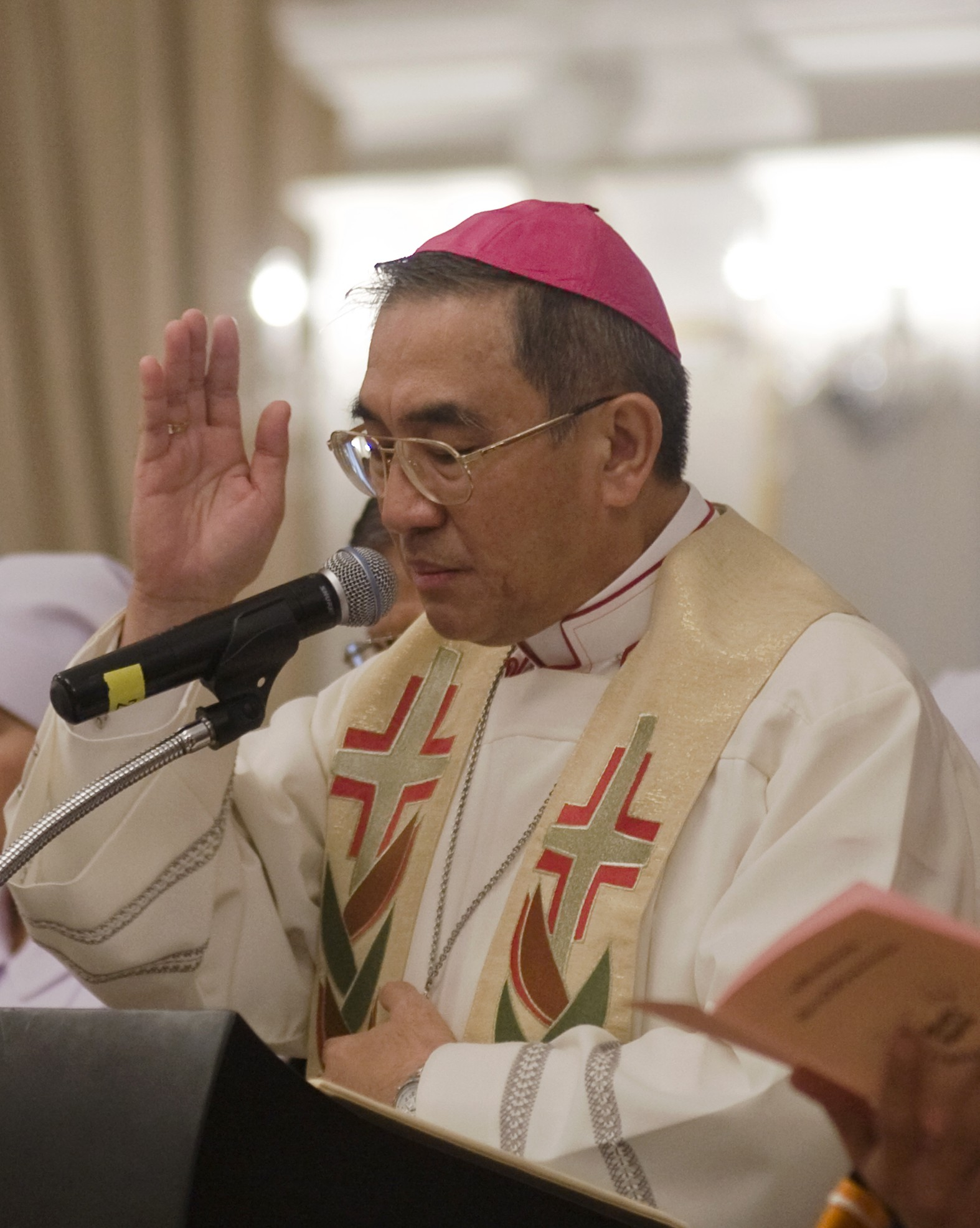
- Kovitvanit in 2010
- Native name: ฟรังซิสเซเวียร์ เกรียงศักดิ์ โกวิทวาณิช
- Church: Catholic Church
- Archdiocese: Bangkok
- See: Bangkok
- Appointed: 14 May 2009
- Installed: 16 August 2009
- Term ended: 27 June 2024
- Predecessor: Michael Michai Kitbunchu
- Successor: Francis Xavier Vira Arpondratana
- Other post: Cardinal-Priest of Santa Maria Addolorata
- Previous post: Bishop of Nakhon Sawan (2007–2009)

Orders
- Ordination: 11 July 1976 by Michael Michai Kitbunchu
- Consecration: 2 June 2007 by Michael Michai Kitbunchu
- Created cardinal: 14 February 2015 by Pope Francis

Personal details
- Born: Francis Xavier Kriengsak Kovithavanij; 27 June 1949 (age 77) Bang Rak, Bangkok, Thailand
- Denomination: Roman Catholic
- Parents: Joseph Piti Kovitvanij; Teresa Phatcharin Kovitvanij
- Motto: Verbum crucis Dei virtus est (The word of the cross is strong) (คำสอนเรื่องกางเขนเป็นอานุภาพของพระเจ้า) (Phra khả h̄æ̀ng mị̂kāngk̄hen khụ̄x khwām k̄hæ̆ngkær̀ng)
- Coat of arms: Francis Xavier Kriengsak Kovitvanij's coat of arms

Ordination history of Kriengsak Kovitvanit
History
Priestly ordination
- Date: 11 July 1976
Episcopal consecration
- Principal consecrator: Michael Michai Kitbunchu
- Co-consecrators: Salvatore Pennacchio Joseph Banchong Aribarg
- Date: 2 June 2007
Cardinalate
- Elevated by: Pope Francis
- Date: 14 February 2015

Styles of Francis Xavier Kriengsak Kovithavanij
- Reference style: His Eminence
- Spoken style: Your Eminence
- Religious style: Cardinal
- Informal style: Cardinal

Francis Xavier Kriengsak Kovitvanij (Thai: ฟรังซิสเซเวียร์ เกรียงศักดิ์ โกวิทวาณิช, RTGS: Kriangsak Kowitwanit, pronounced [krīa̯ŋ.sàk kōː.wít.wāː.nít]; born 27 June 1949) is a Thai Catholic prelate and cardinal who served as Archbishop of Bangkok from 2009 to 2024.

== Biography ==
Kriengsak Kovitvanij was born on 27 June 1949 in Bangkok to ethnic Chinese parents. He entered the St Joseph's Minor Seminary in Sam Phran. From 1970 to 1976 he studied philosophy and theology at the Pontifical Urbaniana University in Rome, and was ordained as priest on 11 July 1976. He was first assigned to be assistant priest at the Nativity of Mary Church in Ban Pan, and then at the Epiphany Church Koh Yai (1977–1979). In 1979–1981 he served as vice-rector of St Joseph's Minor Seminary in Sam Phran. He went to the Gregorian University in Rome from 1982 till 1983 to specialize in spirituality.

From 1983 to 1989 he was rector of the Holy Family Intermediate Seminary in Nakhon Ratchasima, and then till 1993 under-secretary of the Catholic Bishops' Conference of Thailand, as well as rector of Lux Mundi National Major Seminary in Sam Phran since 1992. In 2000 he became parish priest at the church of Our Lady of Lourdes in Hua Take, and also since 2001 a special lecturer at Sam Phran major seminary. From 2003 until his appointment as bishop, he was parish priest of the Assumption Cathedral and secretary of the council of priests of the Archdiocese of Bangkok.

On 7 March 2007 Pope Benedict XVI appointed him bishop of Nakhon Sawan, which had been vacant since 2005, when his predecessor Louis Chamniern Santisukniram was made Archbishop of Thare and Nonseng. He was consecrated on 2 June by Cardinal Michael Michai Kitbunchu, whose successor as Archbishop of Bangkok he became on 14 May 2009. Kovitvanit was installed on 16 August 2009.

On 4 January 2015 it was announced that Pope Francis had appointed him a cardinal. He was made a cardinal on 14 February and at that ceremony, he was appointed Cardinal-Priest of Santa Maria Addolorata.

In April 2015 he was appointed a member of the Congregation for the Evangelization of Peoples and of the Pontifical Council for Social Communications.

Pope Francis accepted his resignation as archbishop of Bangkok on 27 June 2024—the archbishop's 75th birthday.

He participated as a cardinal elector in the 2025 papal conclave that elected Pope Leo XIV.

Catholic Church titles
Preceded by Louis Chamniern Santisukniram	Bishop of Nakhon Sawan; 7 March 2007–14 May 2009	Succeeded by Joseph Pibul Visitnondacha
Preceded by Michael Michai Kitbunchu	Archbishop of Bangkok; 14 May 2009–27 June 2024	Succeeded by Francis Xavier Vira Arpondratana
Preceded by titular church established	Cardinal Priest of Santa Maria Addolorata; 2015–present	Incumbent
