= Sacred Heart Cathedral, Chiang Mai =

Sacred Heart Cathedral
- อาสนวิหารพระหฤทัย
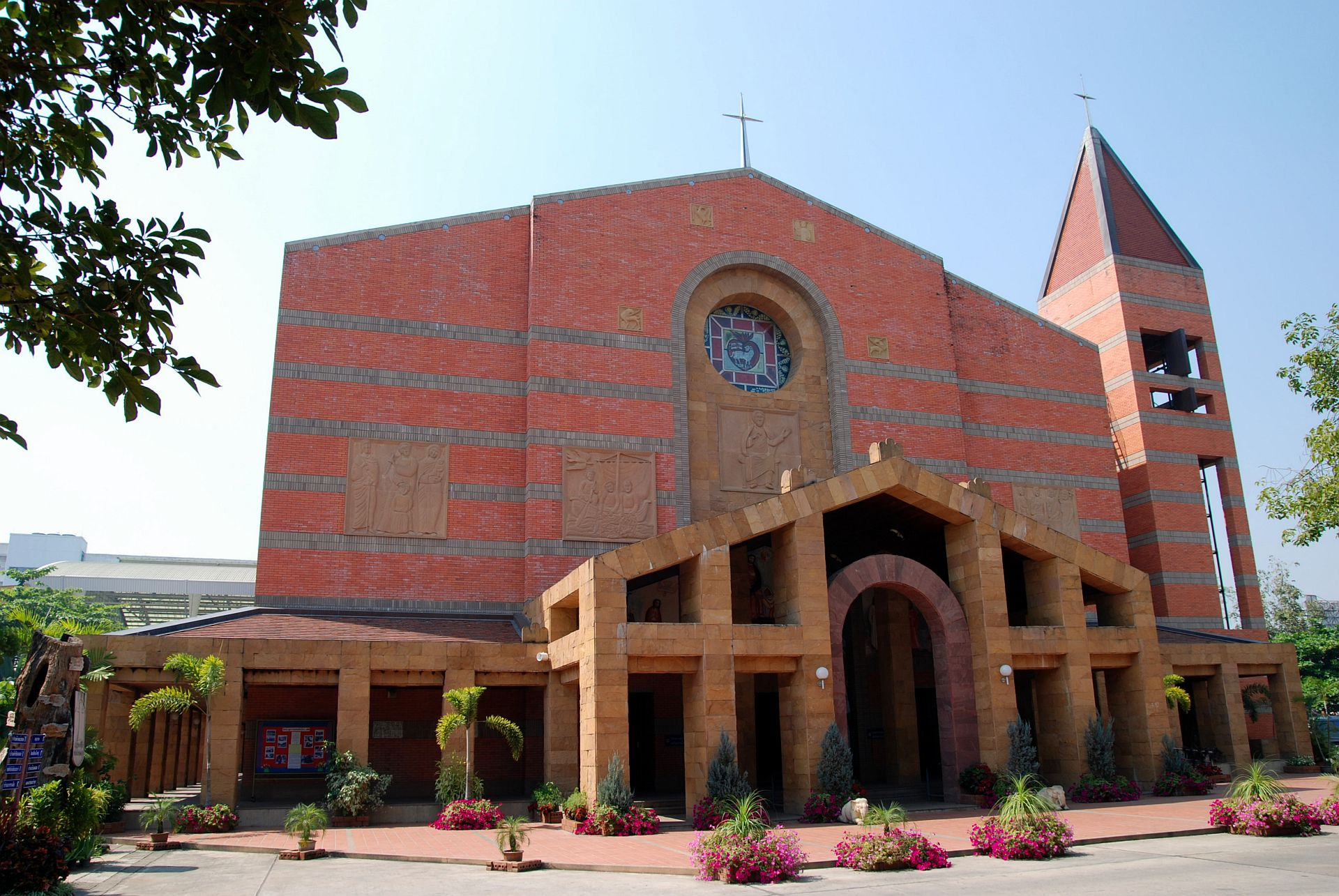

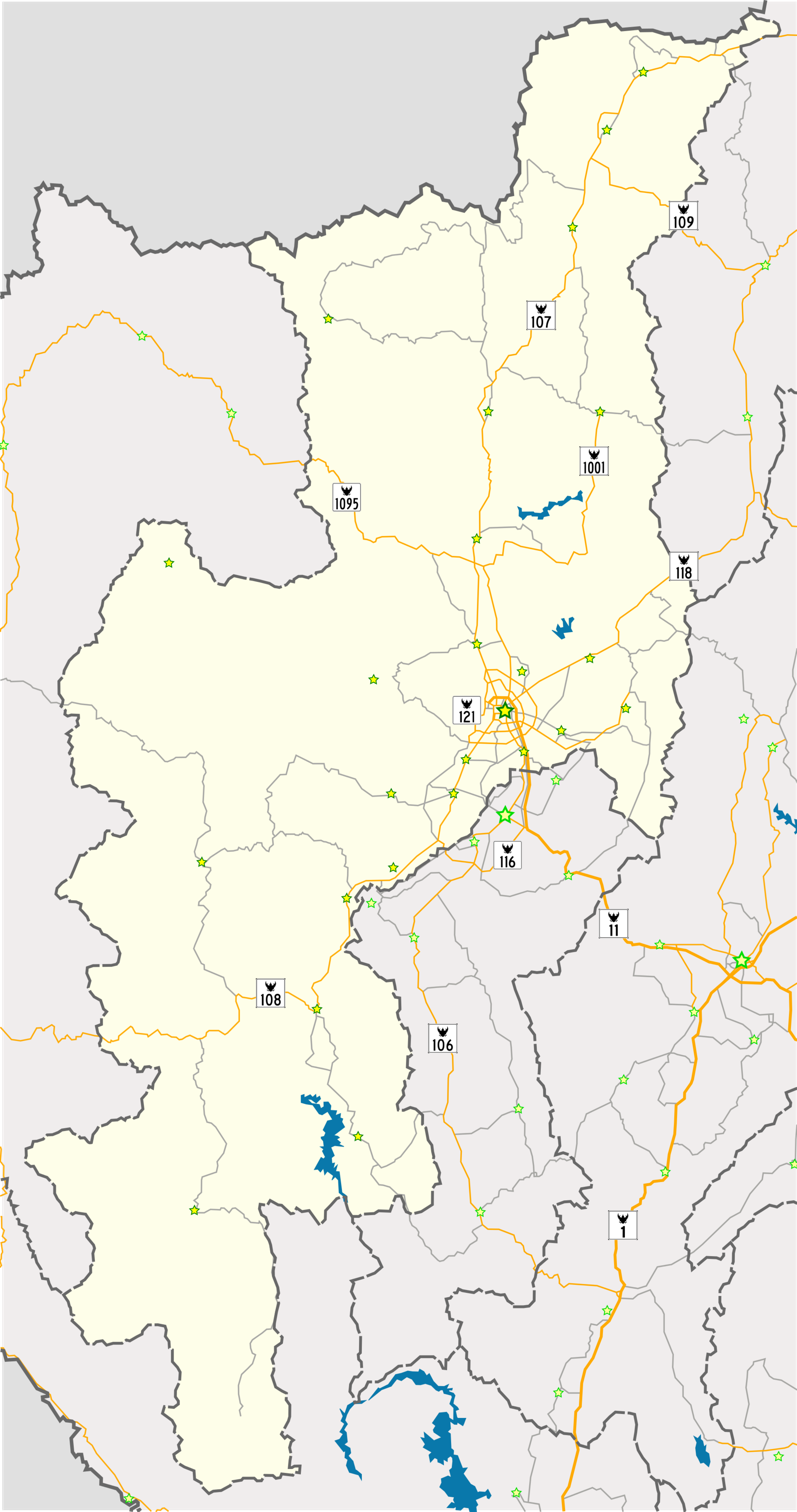
- Location within Chiang Mai Province Location within Thailand
- 18.7751°N 99.0033°E
- Location: Chiang Mai
- Country: Thailand
- Denomination: Roman Catholic Church

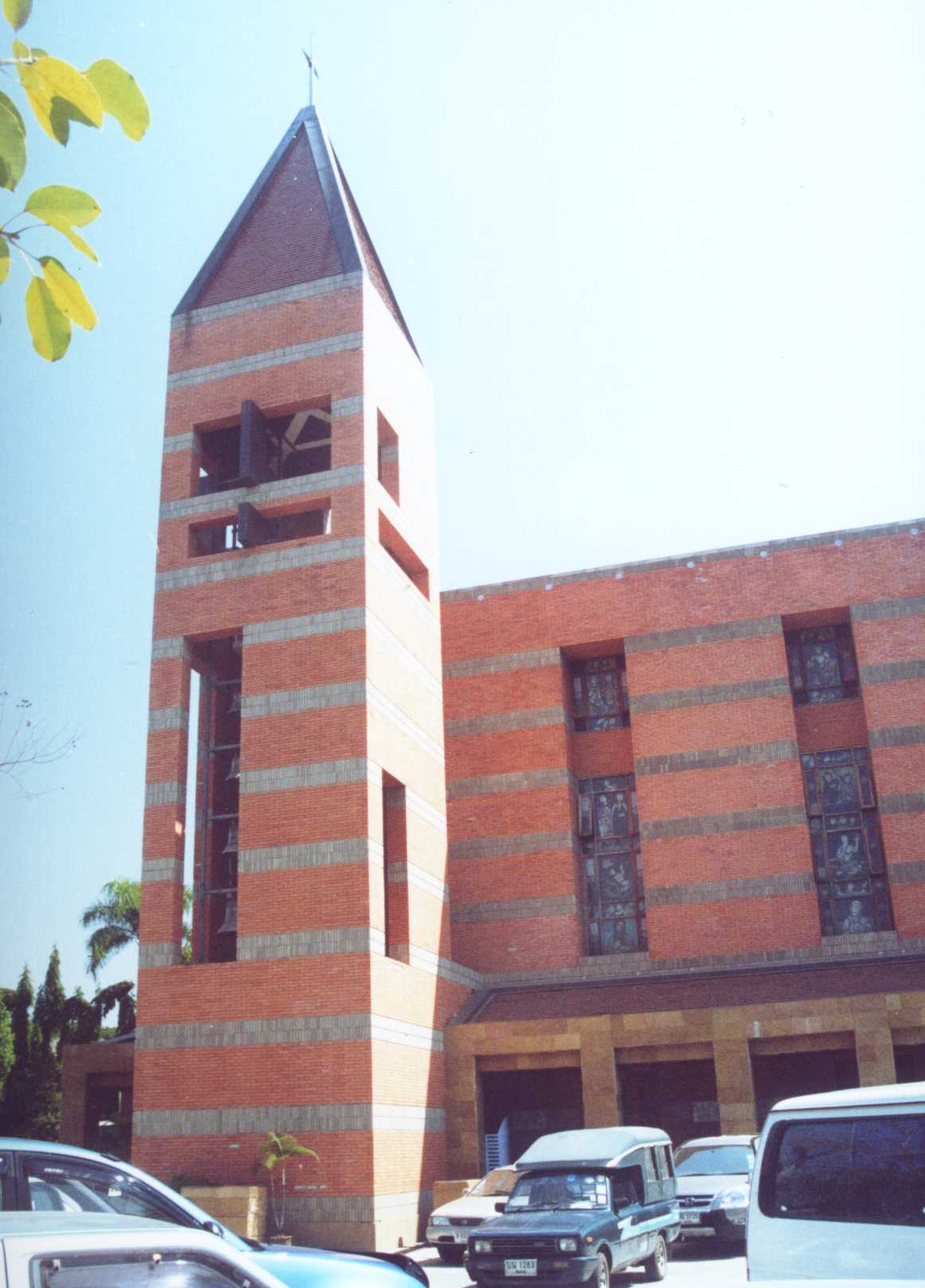
Chiang Mai cathedral tower

The Sacred Heart Cathedral, (Thai: อาสนวิหารพระหฤทัย) also called Chiang Mai Cathedral, is a Catholic Church located in Chiang Mai, Thailand. The cathedral follows the Roman or Latin rite.

== History ==
The present church is the third structure that serves as the cathedral of the diocese, and was inaugurated on October 30, 1999. The first church dedicated to the Sacred Heart was built in 1931. A new and larger church was inaugurated on February 28, 1965 as the principal church of the Diocese of Chiang Mai (Dioecesis Chiangmaiensis, สังฆมณฑลเชียงใหม่), which was created in the same year by bull "Qui in fastigio" of Pope Paul VI.

== Ancillary buildings ==
The Sacred Heart School and a kindergarten surround the church building, having been added in 1932.

== See also ==
- Roman Catholicism in Thailand
- Sacred Heart Cathedral (disambiguation)
