= Joseph Surasarang =

Thai Roman Catholic prelate (1935–2022)

Joseph Sangval Surasarang
- Bishop of Chiang Mai
- Native name: ยอแซฟ สังวาลย์ ศุระศรางค์
- Church: Catholic Church
- Diocese: Diocese of Chiang Mai
- In office: 17 October 1986 – 10 February 2009
- Predecessor: Robert Ratna Bamrungtrakul
- Successor: Francis Xavier Vira Arpondratana

Orders
- Ordination: 22 December 1962
- Consecration: 6 January 1987 by Pope John Paul II

Personal details
- Born: 25 August 1935 Na Khok (in present-day Phak Hai district), Phra Nakhon Si Ayutthaya province, Thailand
- Died: 10 February 2022 (aged 86) Bangkok, Thailand

Joseph Sangval Surasarang (25 August 1935 – 10 February 2022) was a Thai Roman Catholic prelate.

Surasarang was born in Thailand and was ordained to the priesthood in 1962. He served as bishop of the Roman Catholic Diocese of Chiang Mai, Thailand, from 1987 until his resignation in 2009. He died on 10 February 2022 at the age of 84.
