= Louis Chamniern Santisukniram =

Thai Catholic archbishop

Coat of arms of Louis Chamniern Santisukniram.

Louis Chamniern Santisukniram (Thai: หลุยส์ จำเนียร สันติสุขนิรันดร์; RTGS: Chamnian Santisukniran; born October 30, 1942) was the Archbishop of Thare and Nonseng, Thailand.

Louis Chamniern Santisukniram was ordained a priest on May 17, 1970, and was appointed as bishop of the Diocese of Nakhon Sawan on November 5, 1998 (consecrated January 23, 1999 by Cardinal Michael Michai Kitbunchu). On July 1, 2005 he was appointed as the archbishop of Thare and Nonseng, and installed on August 20, 2005. He retired on May 13, 2020.

== Sources ==
- catholic-hierarchy
