= Santa Maria Addolorata, Rome =

Church building in Rome

St. Mary of Sorrows
- Chiesa Parrocchiale di Santa Maria Addolorata a Villa Gordiani (in Italian); S. Mariæ Perdolentis (in Latin)
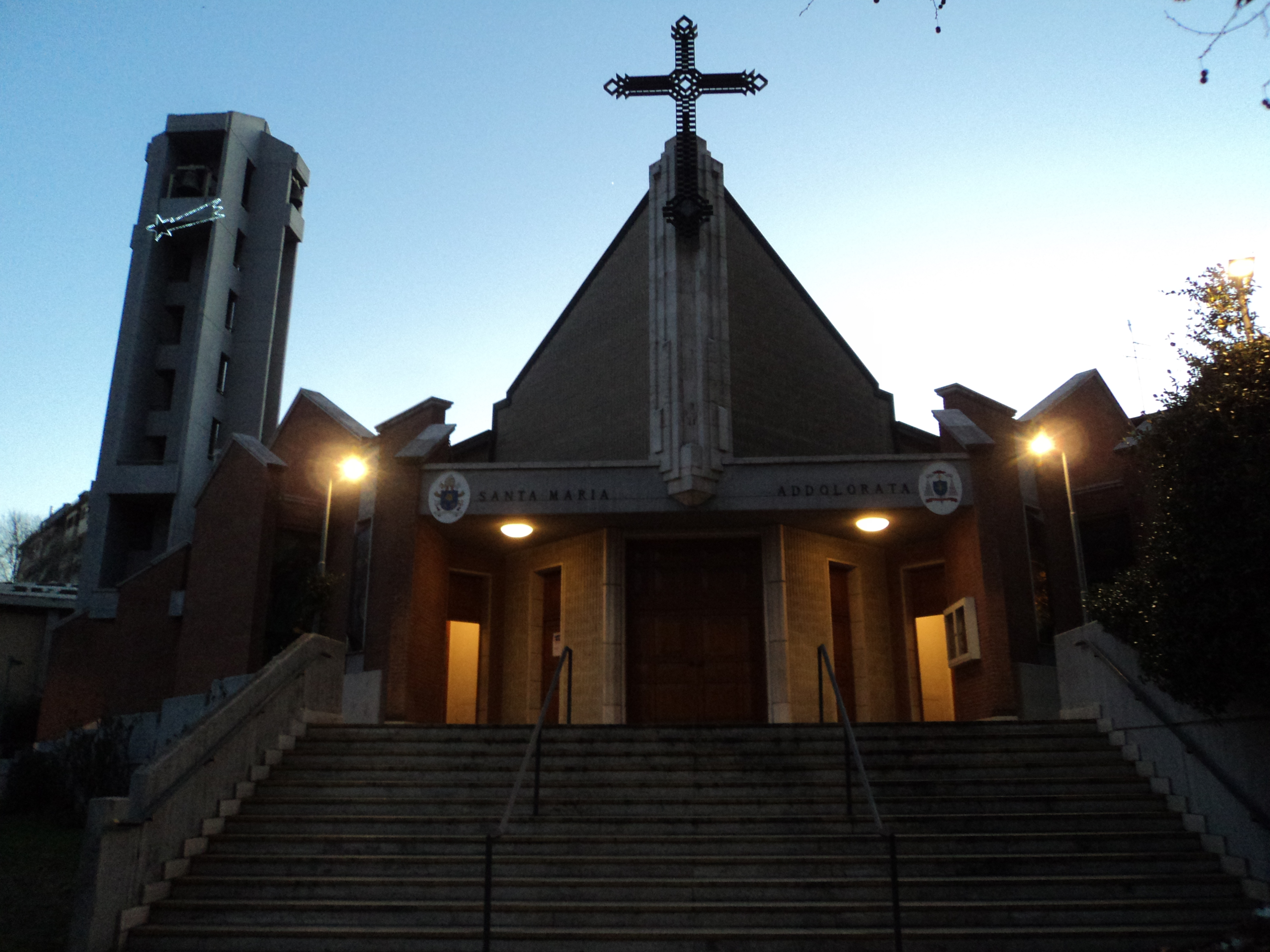
- Facade
- Click on the map for a fullscreen view
- 41°53′46″N 12°33′30″E
- Location: Via della Venezia Giulia 134, Rome
- Country: Italy
- Denomination: Roman Catholic
- Tradition: Roman Rite
- Website: Official website

History
- Status: Titular church
- Dedication: Mary, mother of Jesus (as Our Lady of Sorrows)
- Consecrated: 2001

Architecture
- Architect: Sbardella
- Architectural type: Church
- Style: Modernist
- Groundbreaking: 2000
- Completed: 2001

Administration
- District: Lazio
- Province: Rome

Santa Maria Addolorata ai Goranni is a church in the Collatino district of Rome, located at the intersection of Viale della Serenissima and Viale della Venezia Giulia.

== History ==
It was built between 1998 and 2001 to the designs of the architect Tommaso Sbardella. It was consecrated 17 March 2001 by Cardinal Camillo Ruini.

The church was established as a parish center by Cardinal Vicar Clemente Micara on 14 January 1958 by the decree Quartum iam annum. It was initially entrusted to the Servants of the Poor Missionaries. Since 1987 it has been staffed by the clergy of the diocese of Rome.

On 14 February 2015, Pope Francis instituted this building as a titular church.

== List of Cardinal Protectors ==
- Kriengsak Kovitvanit, 14 February 2015 – present
