= Joseph Banchong Aribarg =

Joseph Banchong Aribang (Thai: บรรจง อารีพรรค; RTGS: Banchong Ariphak; May 27, 1927 – September 1, 2012) was the Roman Catholic bishop of the Roman Catholic Diocese of Nakhon Sawan, Thailand.

Ordained to the priesthood in 1956, Banchong Aribang was named bishop in 1976 and resigned in 1998.
