= Diocese of Chiang Rai =

Latin Catholic diocese in Thailand

Coordinates: 19.913928°N 99.844083°E

Diocese of Chiang Rai Dioecesis Chiangraiensis

Location
- Country: Thailand
- Ecclesiastical province: Bangkok
- Metropolitan: Bangkok

Statistics
- Area: 37.839 km^{2} (14.610 sq mi)
- Population: Total; Catholics: (as of 2018); 2,683,794; 18,062 (0.7%)
- Parishes: 16
- Churches: 130
- Schools: 6

Information
- Denomination: Catholic Church
- Sui iuris church: Latin Church
- Rite: Roman Rite
- Cathedral: The Nativity of Our Lady Cathedral in Chiang Rai

Current leadership
- Pope: Leo XIV
- Bishop: Joseph Vuthilert Haelom
- Metropolitan Archbishop: Francis Xavier Vira Arpondratana

The Diocese of Chiang Rai (Dioecesis Chiangraiensis) in northern Thailand is a Latin Catholic suffragan diocese of the Archdiocese of Bangkok.

The diocese covers an area of 37,839 km^{2}, covering four provinces: Chiang Rai, Nan, Phayao, Phrae and Ngao District of the Lampang Province. The diocese is divided into 16 parishes, having 47 priests altogether.

As of 2018, of the 2.684 million citizens in the area, 18,062 are members of the Catholic Church.

== History ==
The diocese was erected on 25 April 2018, when it was split off from the Diocese of Chiang Mai.

== Cathedral ==
The Nativity of Our Lady Cathedral in Chiang Rai.

== Bishops ==
- Joseph Vuthilert Haelom: appointed 25 April 2018
