= Protopriest of the College of Cardinals =

Title held by a member of the College of Cardinals

The Cardinal Protopresbyter or Protopriest (Italian: Cardinale protopresbitero) in the College of Cardinals, is the first Cardinal-Priest in the order of precedence, hence directly after the Cardinal-bishops.

This title is always attached to the most senior Cardinal Priest according to date of his creation. From the 17th century until the end of the 19th century, the Protopriest was usually assigned to the Titular church of San Lorenzo in Lucina. The last protoprete who opted for that title was Mieczysław Halka Ledóchowski in 1896.

The protopriest has the honor of pronouncing the formal prayer for the new pope at the papal inauguration after the protodeacon (most senior Cardinal deacon) bestows the pallium and before the Dean of the College of Cardinals (most senior Cardinal-bishop) presents the Ring of the Fisherman. This last happened at the inauguration of Pope Benedict XVI in 2005, but did not happen at the inauguration of Pope Francis in 2013 because the protopriest, Cardinal Paulo Evaristo Arns, then 91 years old, remained in São Paulo, Brazil, and did not attend. (Note: The duties of the protopriest were discharged by the senior cardinal-priest from the cardinal-electors, Godfried Danneels, Archbishop Emeritus of Mechelen-Brussels.)

Cardinal Michael Michai Kitbunchu of Bangkok has been the protopriest since 14 December 2016.

== Protopriests since 1920 ==
- James Gibbons, 1920–1921
- Michael Logue, 1921–1924
- Giuseppe Francica-Nava de Bontifè, 1924–1928
- Lev Skrbenský z Hřiště, 1928–1938
- William Henry O'Connell, 1938–1944
- Alessio Ascalesi, 1944–May 1952
- Michael von Faulhaber, May–June 1952
- Alessandro Verde, June 1952–1958
- Jozef-Ernest van Roey, 1958–1961
- Manuel Gonçalves Cerejeira, 1961–1977
- Carlos Vasconcellos Motta, 1977–1982
- Giuseppe Siri, 1982–1989
- Paul-Émile Léger, 1989–1991
- Franz König, 1991–2004
- Stephen Kim, 2004–2009
- Eugênio Sales, 2009–2012
- Paulo Evaristo Arns, 2012–2016
- Michael Michai Kitbunchu, 2016–present

== See also ==
- Cardinal Dean
- Cardinal Protodeacon
