= Diocese of Nakhon Sawan =

Latin Catholic diocese in Thailand

Diocese of Nakhon Sawan Dioecesis Nakhonsauanensis สังฆมณฑลนครสวรรค์

Location
- Country: Thailand
- Ecclesiastical province: Bangkok
- Metropolitan: Bangkok

Statistics
- Area: 93,547 km^{2} (36,119 sq mi)
- Population: Total; Catholics: (as of 2006); 8.2 million; 9,237 (0.1%)

Information
- Denomination: Catholic
- Sui iuris church: Latin Church
- Rite: Roman Rite
- Cathedral: St Anne's Cathedral in Nakhon Sawan

Current leadership
- Pope: Leo XIV
- Bishop: Paul Tawat Singsa
- Metropolitan Archbishop: Francis Xavier Vira Arpondratana

Map
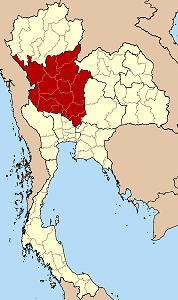

The Diocese of Nakhon Sawan (Dioecesis Nakhonsauanensis, Thai: สังฆมณฑลนครสวรรค์) in central Thailand is a Latin Catholic suffragan diocese of the Archdiocese of Bangkok.

The diocese covers an area of 93,547 km^{2}, covering 13 provinces - Chainat, Kamphaeng Phet, Lopburi, Nakhon Sawan, Saraburi, Sukhothai, Tak, Uthai Thani, Uttaradit.

As of 2001, of the 8.2 million citizens, 9,237 are Catholics. It is divided into 28 parishes, having 27 priests altogether.

== History ==
The diocese was erected on February 9, 1967, when it was split off from the archdiocese of Bangkok.

== Cathedral ==
The St. Anna Cathedral is located in downtown Nakhon Sawan (15°41′37″N 100°7′13″E).

== Bishops ==
- Michel-Auguste-Marie Langer, M.E.P. (February 9, 1967 – May 24, 1976)
- Joseph Banchong Aribarg (May 24, 1976 – November 5, 1998)
- Louis Chamniern Santisukniram (November 5, 1998 – July 1, 2005); became Archbishop of Thare and Nonseng
- Francis Xavier Kriengsak Kovitvanit (March 7, 2007 – May 15, 2009); became Archbishop of Bangkok
- Joseph Pibul Visitnondachai (June 19, 2009 – February 12, 2024)
- Paul Tawat Singsa (February 12, 2024 – )
