= Archdiocese of Bangkok =

Latin Catholic archdiocese in Thailand

Archdiocese of Bangkok Archidiœcesis Bangkokensis อัครสังฆมณฑลกรุงเทพฯ
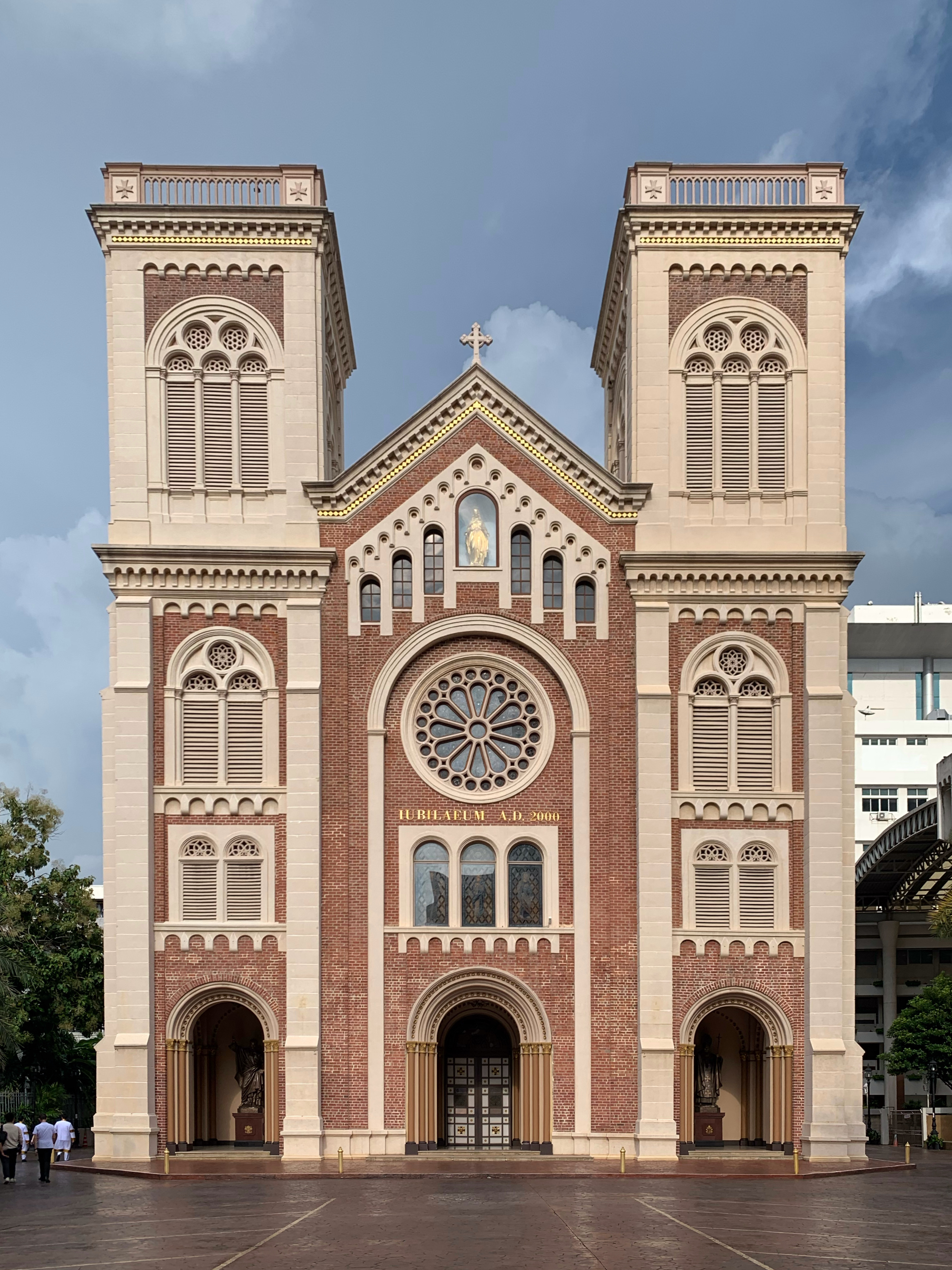
- Assumption Cathedral, Bangkok

Location
- Country: Thailand
- Territory: Bangkok
- Coordinates: 13.4323°N 100.3054°E

Statistics
- Area: 18,831 km^{2} (7,271 sq mi)
- Population: Total; Catholics: (as of 2012); 13,226,721; 115,945 (0.9%)
- Parishes: 54

Information
- Denomination: Catholic
- Sui iuris church: Latin Church
- Rite: Roman Rite
- Established: December 18, 1965
- Cathedral: Assumption Cathedral, Bangkok

Current leadership
- Pope: Leo XIV
- Archbishop: Francis Xavier Vira Arpondratana
- Bishops emeritus: Michael Michai Kitbunchu; Francis Xavier Kriengsak Kovitvanij

Map
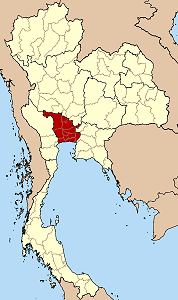

Website
- catholic.or.th

The Archdiocese of Bangkok (Latin: Archidiœcesis Bangkokensis, Thai: อัครสังฆมณฑลกรุงเทพฯ) is a Latin Catholic archdiocese in Thailand. The bishop's seat is the Assumption Cathedral, Bangkok.

== History ==
In 1662, the Apostolic Vicariate of Siam was created on territory split off from the Apostolic Vicariate of Cochinchina, based in Vietnam.

It was renamed the Apostolic Vicariate of Eastern Siam on 10 September 1841, having lost territory to establish the Apostolic Vicariate of Western Siam. On 5 May 1899 it lost more territory to establish the Apostolic Vicariate of Laos.

It was renamed the Apostolic Vicariate of Bangkok on 3 December 1924.

It lost more territories: on 30 June 1930 to establish the Mission sui juris of Rajaburi, on 11 May 1944 to establish the Apostolic Vicariate of Chantaburi and on 17 November 1959 to establish the Apostolic Prefecture of Chieng-Mai. All three of these have become its suffragans.

On 18 December 1965, it was elevated to the rank of a Metropolitan archdiocese.

On 9 February 1967 it lost territory to establish the Diocese of Nakhon Sawan as its suffragan.

It was visited by Pope John Paul II in May 1984 and Pope Francis in November 2019.

== Extent ==
The archdiocese covers an area of 18,831 km^{2}, and as of 2002 it is responsible for 81,646 Catholic Christians, 0.7% of the about 12 million living in the area. It covers the administrative provinces Ayutthaya, Bangkok, Nakhon Pathom, Nonthaburi, Pathum Thani, Samut Prakan, Samut Sakhon and Suphanburi; also the parts west of the Bang Pa Kong River of Chachoengsao and Ban Na of Nakhon Nayok belong to the diocese.

== Ordinaries ==
=== Apostolic Vicars of Siam ===
- Louis Laneau, M.E.P. (1669–1696)
- Louis Champion de Cicé, M.E.P (1700–1727)
- Jean-Jacques Tessier de Quéralay, M.E.P. (1727–1736)
- Jean de Lolière-Puycontat, M.E.P. (1738–1755)
- Pierre Brigot, M.E.P. (1755–1776), appointed Ecclesiastical Superior of the Coromandel Coast (India)
- Olivier-Simon Le Bon, M.E.P. (1776–1780)
- Joseph-Louis Coudé, M.E.P. (1782–1785)
- Arnaud-Antoine Garnault, M.E.P. (1786–1811)
- Esprit-Marie-Joseph Florens, M.E.P. (1811–1834)
- Jean-Paul-Hilaire-Michel Courvezy, M.E.P. (1834–1841)

=== Apostolic Vicars of Eastern Siam ===
- Jean-Baptiste Pallegoix, M.E.P. (1841–1862)
- Ferdinand-Aimé-Augustin-Joseph Dupond, M.E.P. (1864–1872)
- Jean-Louis Vey, M.E.P. (1875–1909)
- René-Marie-Joseph Perros, M.E.P. (1909–1924)

=== Apostolic Vicars of Bangkok ===
- René-Marie-Joseph Perros, M.E.P. (1924–1947)
- Louis-August-Clément Chorin, M.E.P. (1947–1965)
- Joseph Khiamsun Nittayo (1965)

=== Archbishops of Bangkok ===
- Joseph Khiamsun Nittayo (1965–1972)
- Cardinal Michael Michai Kitbunchu (1972–2009)
- Cardinal Francis Xavier Kriengsak Kovitvanit (2009–2024)
- Francis Xavier Vira Arpondratana (2025-present)

=== Coadjutor Bishops ===
- Jean-Jacques Tessier de Quéralay, M.E.P. (1717–1727)
- Pierre Brigot, M.E.P. (1755)
- Olivier-Simon Le Bon, M.E.P. (1764–1776)
- Esprit-Marie-Joseph Florens, M.E.P. (1810–1811)
- Barthélemy Bruguière, M.E.P. (1828–1831), appointed Apostolic Vicar of Korea
- Jean-Paul-Hilaire-Michel Courvezy, M.E.P. (1832–1834)
- Jean-Baptiste Pallegoix, M.E.P. (1838–1841)
- Joseph Khiamsun Nittayo (1963–1965)

== Province ==
Its ecclesiastical province comprises the Metropolitan's own archdiocese and these six suffragan bishoprics :

- Diocese of Chanthaburi
- Diocese of Chiang Mai
- Diocese of Chiang Rai
- Diocese of Nakhon Sawan
- Diocese of Ratchaburi
- Diocese of Surat Thani

== See also ==
- Christianity in Thailand
- Catholic Church in Thailand
- List of Catholic dioceses in Thailand
- List of Catholic dioceses (structured_view)-Episcopal Conference of Thailand
- Immaculate Conception Church, Bangkok
