= Catholic Church in Thailand =

- Thai: โรมันคาทอลิกในประเทศไทย
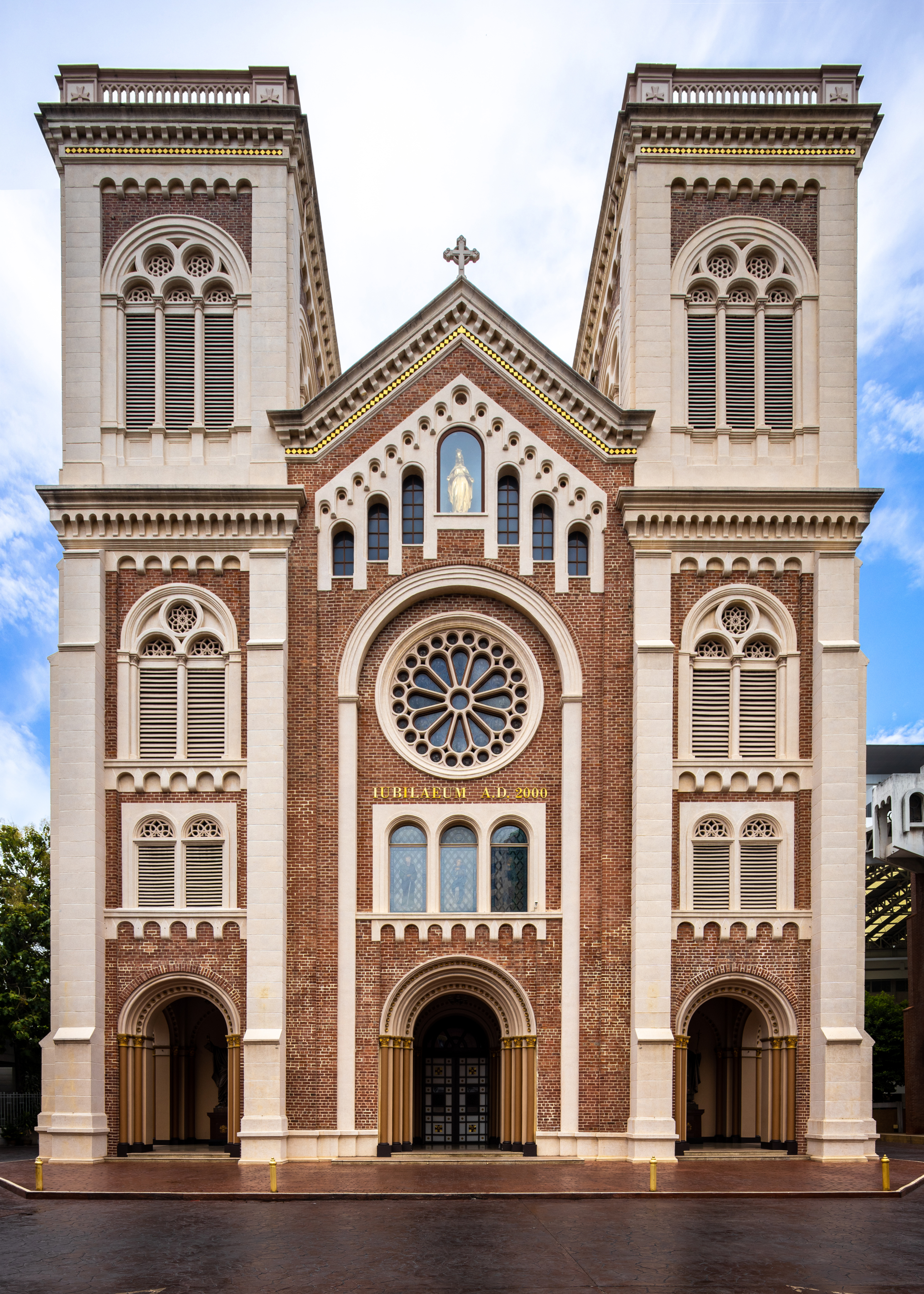
- Assumption Cathedral, Bangkok
- Type: National polity
- Classification: Catholic
- Orientation: Asian Christianity, Latin
- Scripture: Bible
- Theology: Catholic theology
- Pope: Leo XIV
- President: Joseph Chusak Sirisut
- Apostolic Nuncio: Peter Bryan Wells
- Region: Thailand
- Language: Thai, Latin
- Headquarters: Assumption Cathedral, Bangkok
- Members: 388,468 (0.58%)
- Official website: Catholic Church in Thailand website

The Catholic Church in Thailand is part of the worldwide Catholic Church, under the spiritual leadership of the Pope in Rome.

According to Catholic Social Communications of Thailand, as of 2019 there are 388,468 Catholics in Thailand, a figure that represents about 0.58% of the Thai population of 69 million. There are 11 dioceses with 526 parishes and 662 priests.

== History ==
The first historical record of an attempt to introduce Christianity to Thailand is owed to John Peter Maffei who stated that about 1550 a French Franciscan named Bonferre, hearing of the great kingdom of the Peguans and the Siamese in the East, went on a Portuguese ship from Goa to Cosme (Peguan), where for three years he preached the Gospel, but without any converts.

In 1552 Francis Xavier, writing from Sancian to his friend Diego Pereira, expressed his desire to go to Siam, but his death on 2 December 1552, prevented him. In 1553 several Portuguese ships landed in Siam, and at the request of the king three hundred Portuguese soldiers entered his service. The following year two Dominicans, Fathers Hieronymus of the Cross and Sebastian de Cantù, joined them as chaplains. In a short time, they established three parishes at Ayutthaya with about fifteen hundred converted Siamese. Both missionaries, however, were murdered by locals in 1569, and were replaced by Fathers Lopez Cardoso, John Madeira, Alphonsus Ximenes, Louis Fonseca (martyred in 1600), and John Maldonatus (d. 1598).

=== 17th century ===
In 1606 the Jesuit Balthasar de Sequeira, at the request of the Portuguese merchant Tristan Golayo, and in 1624 Father Julius Cesar Margico, came to Ayutthaya and gained the favour of the king. A subsequent persecution, however, stopped the propagation of the Christian faith and no missionaries were allowed until Siam was made a Vicariate Apostolic by Pope Alexander VII on 22 August 1662. Soon after, Msgr. Pierre de la Motte-Lambert, Vicar-Apostolic of Cochin China, arrived at Ayutthaya, accompanied by Fathers De Bourges and Deydier. In 1664 he was joined by Msgr. Pallu, Vicar Apostolic of Tong King. Siam, in those days a rendezvous of commercial enterprise in the East, gave shelter to several hundred Annamite and Japanese Christians who had been expelled or lived there as exiles due to persecutions at home.

Some Portuguese and Spanish Jesuits, Franciscans, and Augustinians provided the spiritual care of their countrymen in Siam. Msgr. Pallu, on his return to Rome (1665), obtained a Brief from Pope Clement IX (4 July 1669), by which the Vicariate of Siam was entrusted to the newly founded Society of Foreign Missions of Paris. In 1673 Father Laneau was consecrated titular Bishop of Metellopolis and first Vicar Apostolic of Siam, and ever since Siam has been under the spiritual care of the Society of Foreign Missions. King Phra Narai gave the Catholic missionaries a hearty welcome, and made them a gift of land for a church, a mission-house, and a seminary (St. Joseph's colony). Through the influence of the Greek or Venetian, Constantine Phaulkon, prime minister to King Narai, the latter sent a diplomatic embassy to Louis XIV in 1684. The French king returned the compliment by sending M. de Chaumont, accompanied by some Jesuits under Fathers de Fontenay and Guy Tachard.

On 10 December 1685, King Naraï signed a treaty at Louvo (Lopburi) with France, in which he permitted Catholic missionaries to preach the Gospel throughout Siam, exempted his Catholic subjects from work on Sunday, and appointed a special mandarin to settle disputes between Christians and others. However, after the departure of M. De Chaumont, a Siamese nobleman, Phra-phret-racha, instigated a revolution in which Greece's Minister to Ayutthaya was murdered, King Naraï deposed, Msgr. Laneau and several missionaries were taken prisoners and ill-treated, and Siamese Christians were persecuted.

When peace and order were restored in 1690, Bishop Laneau resumed work until his death in 1696. His successor, Bishop Louis of Cice (1700–1727), was able to continue it in peace. However, after his death the rest of the century is a history of persecutions (those of 1729, 1755, 1764 are the most notable), either by local nobles or Burmese invaders, though the kings remained more or less favourable to the missionaries and to Bishops Texier de Kerlay and de Lolière-Puycontat (1755). During the inroads of the Burmese, the Siamese king even appealed to Bishop Brigot for help against the common foe, who sacked and burned the Catholic stations and colleges and imprisoned both the bishop and the missionaries.

In 1769 Father Corre resumed the missions in Siam and thus paved the way for the new vicar Apostolic, Msgr. Lebon (1772–80). However, a fresh persecution in 1775 forced him to leave the kingdom, and neither of his successors, Bishops Condé and Garnault, was able to accomplish much. During the Burmese wars, the Christians were reduced in number from 12,000 to 1000, and Bishop Florens was left in charge with only seven native priests.

=== 19th century ===
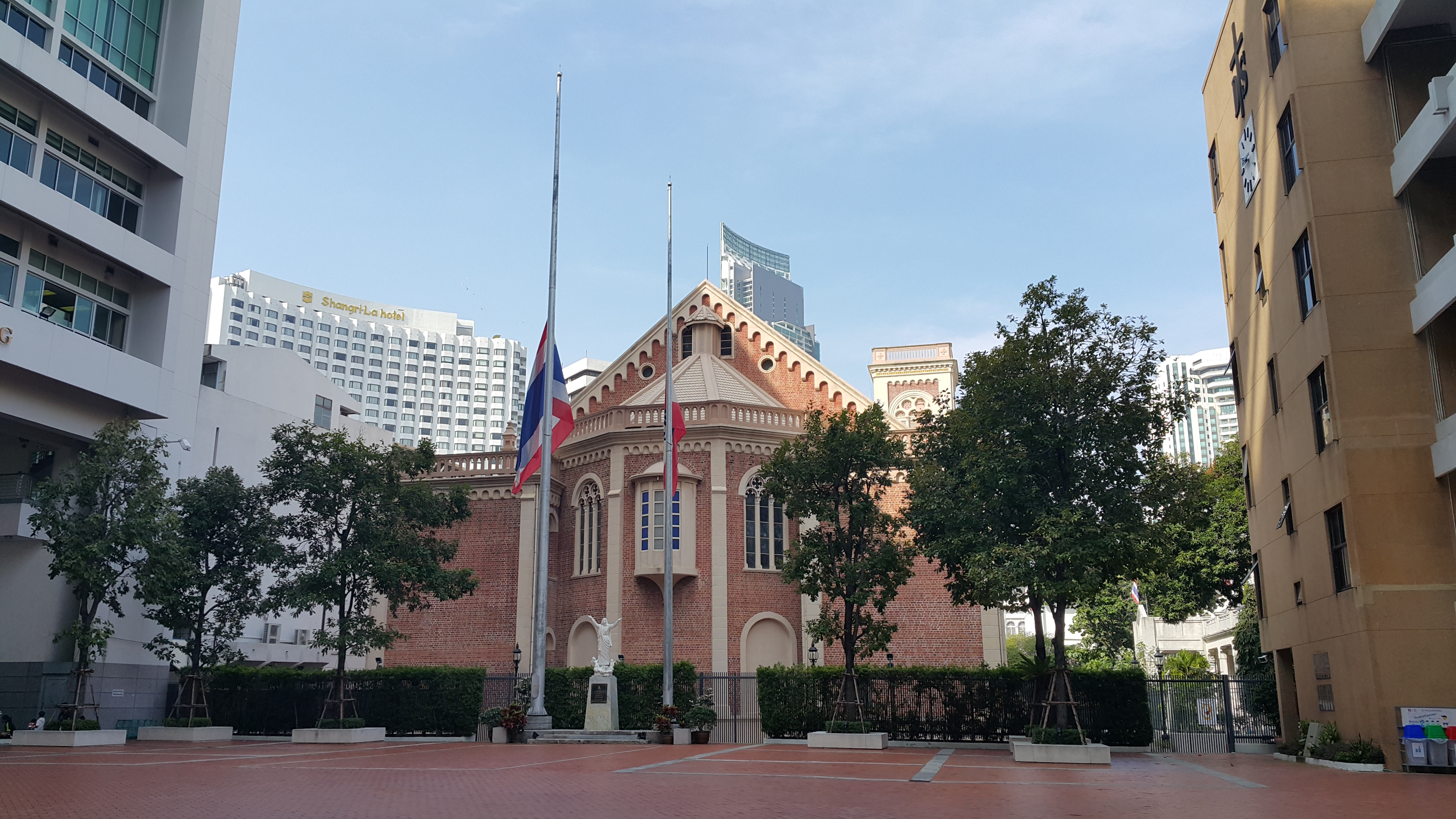
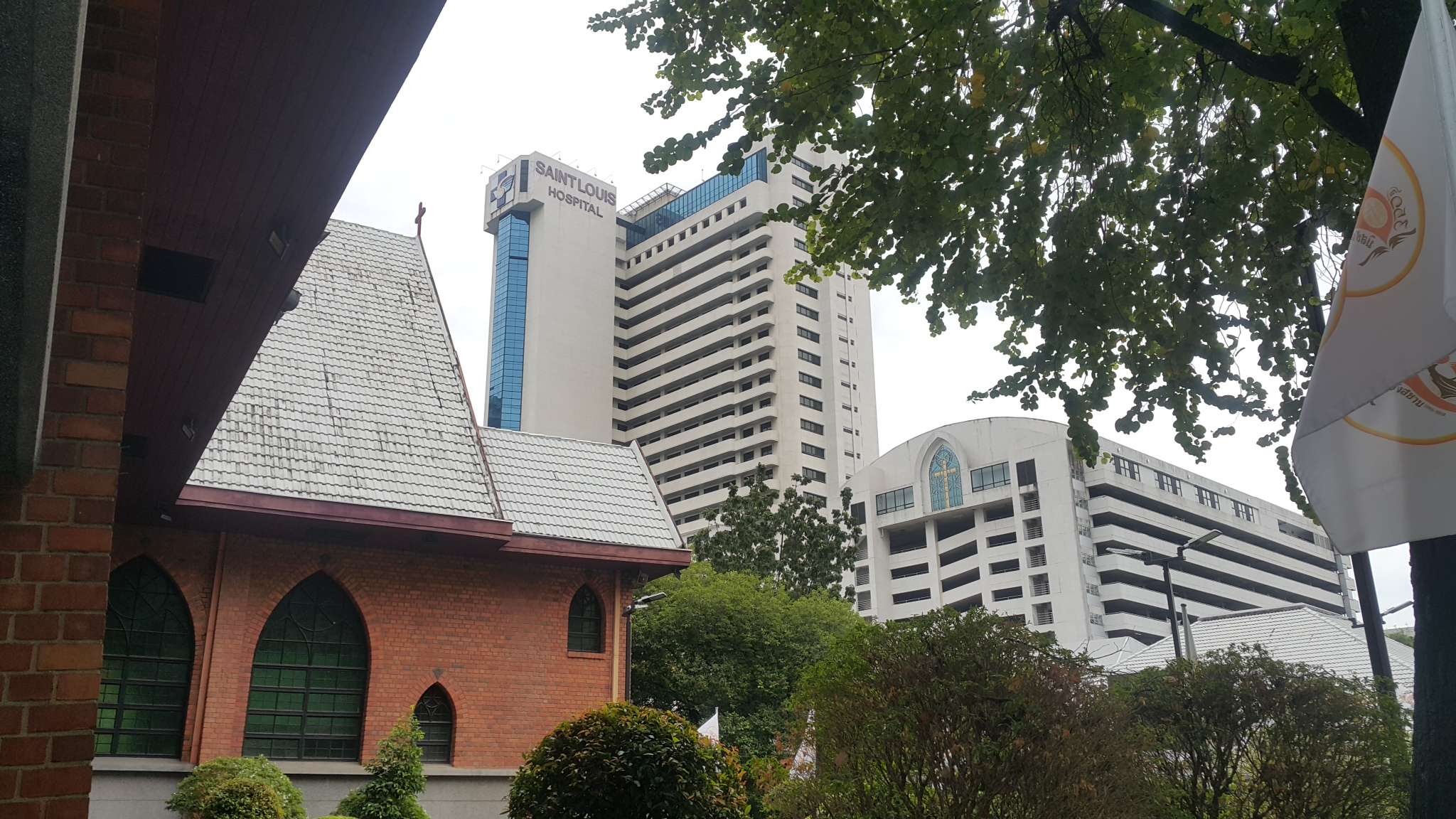
(left) Assumption College, first Catholic academy in Thailand, founded 1885
(right) Saint Louis Hospital, first Catholic hospital in Thailand, founded 1898

It was only in 1826 and 1830 that a fresh supply of European missionaries arrived, among them Fathers Bouchot, Barbe, Bruguière, Vachal, Grandjean, Pallegoix, and Courvezy. In 1834 the last was appointed Vicar Apostolic of Siam, and the missions began to revive. Under him Siam numbered 6,590 Catholics and 11 European and seven native priests. His successor, Bishop Pallegoix (1840–1862), author of Description du royaume Thai ou Siam and Dictionnaire siamois-latin-français-anglais (30,000 words), was one of the most distinguished vicars Apostolic of Siam, the best Siamese scholar, and a missionary among the Laotines. He induced Napoleon III to renew the French alliance with Siam and to send an embassy under M. de Montigny to Siam in 1856. On 8 July 1856, King Mongkut signed a political-commercial treaty with France, by which the privileges granted to the Catholic missionaries by Phra-Naraï in the 17th century were renewed. The bishop was highly esteemed by the king, who personally assisted at his funeral and accepted from the missionaries as a token of friendship the bishop's ring.

Thanks to the broad-mindedness of Kings Mongkut (1851–1868) and Chulalongkorn (1868–1910), the Catholic Church in Siam enjoyed peace under Pallegoix's successors, Bishops Dupont (1862–1872) and Vey (1875–1909). Owing to the complications between France and Siam, in 1894, the missionaries had to endure the ill will of local mandarins, though the minister of foreign affairs promised that no harm would be done to the missionaries and their work on account of the French invasion.

=== 20th century ===
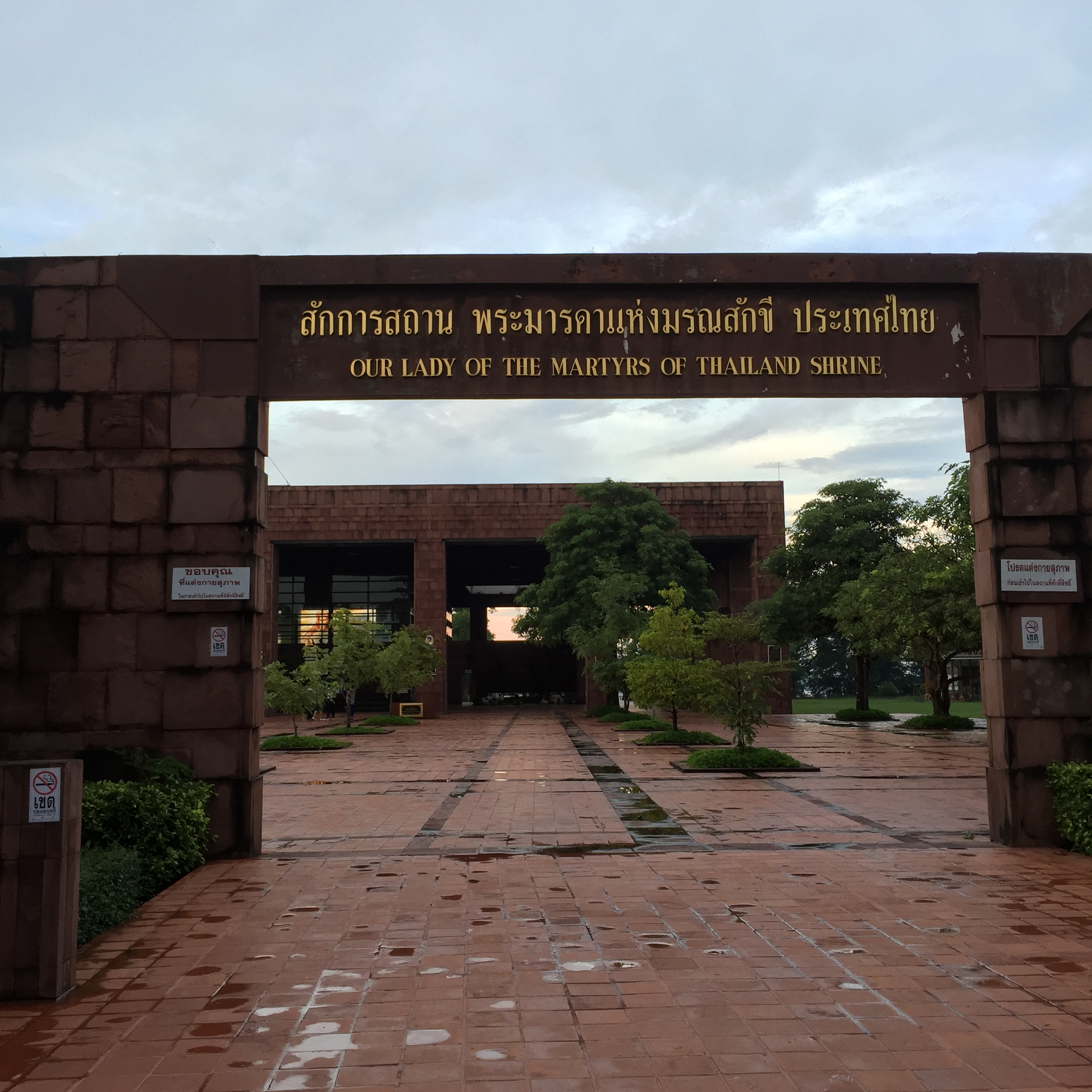
Our Lady of Martyrs of Songkhon Basilica

At the beginning of the 20th century, there were about 23,000 Catholic believers, 55 churches and chapels, representatives of such monastic orders, social and educational institutions (e.g., orphanages, schools and a seminary, college). During the 20th century, many other Catholic congregations arrived to work in Thailand.

In 1975 the Catholic Office for Emergency Relief and Refugees was established for protection of moral values and social work, including the urgent problem created by refugees from Indochina.

Pope John Paul II became the first pope to visit Thailand, 10–11 May 1984. The pope told King Rama IX Bhumibol Adulyadej that his visit was not only to return the courtesy when the king visited his predecessor Pope John XXIII in 1960 but to also personally thank Thailand for welcoming refugees which he said was an exemplary example of humanity. King Rama IX told the pope he observed how Christianity had grown in the kingdom and recognized how the relationship between Thailand and the Vatican first began hundreds of years earlier during the Ayutthaya Kingdom.

On 22 October 1989, the Martyrs of Thailand were beatified. The catechist Philip Siphong Onphitak and six companions had been killed in 1940 as suspected French spies at a time when Thailand was at war with the French.

=== 21st century ===
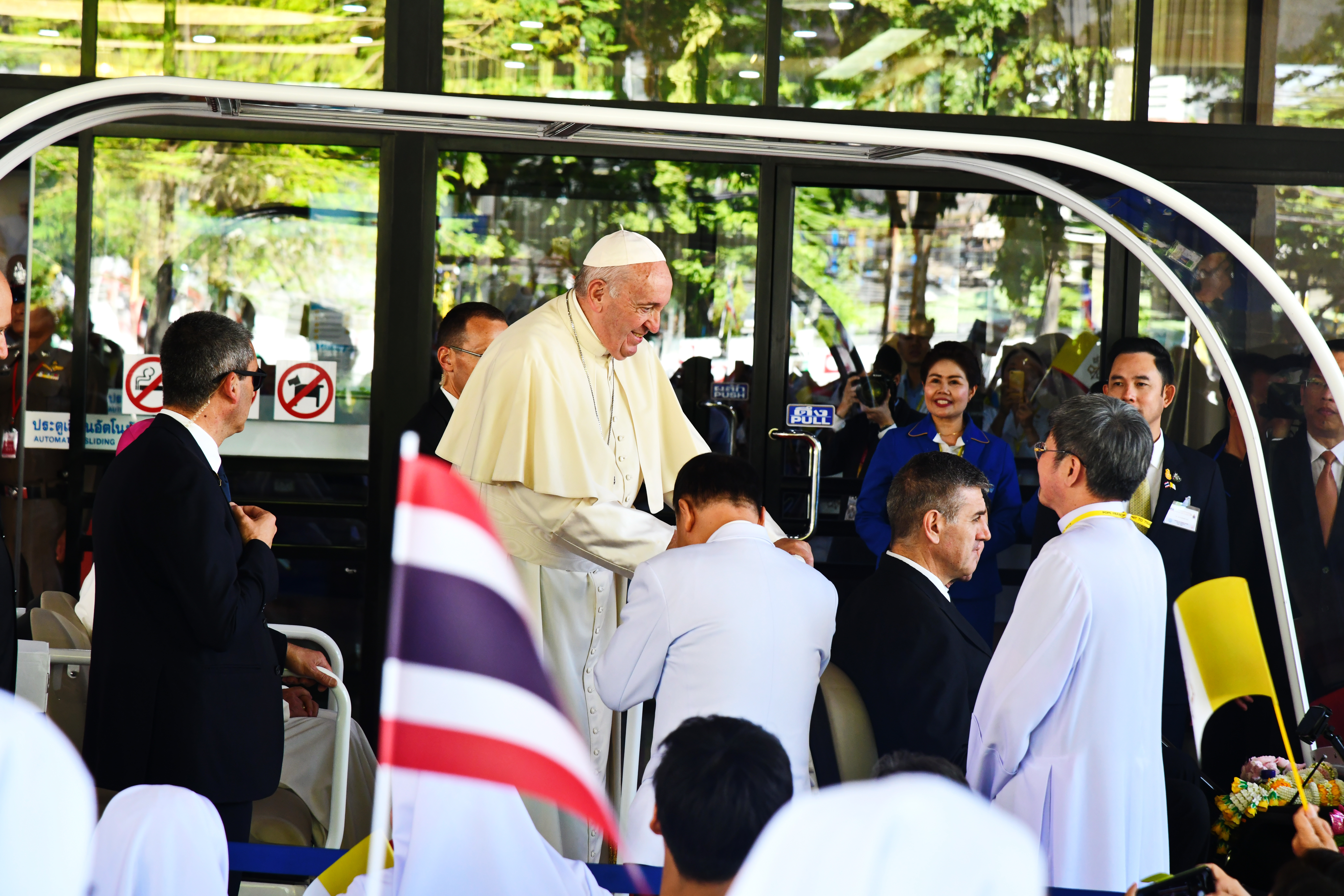
Pope Francis at Saint Louis Hospital (Bangkok) during his visit to Thailand in 2019

In 2003, there were 278,000 Catholics in Thailand, which constituted 0.44% of the total population at the time. The Catholic population of Thailand are mainly concentrated among the hill tribes of Northern Thailand and in Bangkok.

Some members of the Catholic religious orders in Thailand (Religious of the Good Shepherd, Sisters of the Sacred Heart of Jesus, Sisters of St. Paul de Chartres) take an active part in fight against human trafficking.

Thai Prime Minister Yingluck Shinawatra visited the Vatican on 13 September 2013 where she met Pope Francis. Her visit was the first to the Holy See by a Thai governmental leader in over 50 years. At this meeting Yingluck formally invited Pope Francis to visit Thailand, although no dates were discussed at the time.

Pope Francis visited Thailand from 19–23 November 2019 as part of an Asian tour, the first such papal visit since that of Pope John Paul II in 1984. The papal visit marks the 350th anniversary of the establishment of the Apostolic Vicariate of Siam, which brought Catholicism to Thailand in 1669, as well as the 50th anniversary of formal diplomatic relations between Thailand and the Vatican. While in Thailand he had audiences with the prime minister Prayut Chan-o-cha, King Vajiralongkorn, and the supreme Buddhist patriarch, as well as celebrating masses at the National Stadium and Assumption Cathedral.

== Administration ==
The church in Thailand is administered by 11 dioceses, including two archdioceses.

- Bangkok (Archdiocese)
  - Chanthaburi
  - Chiang Mai
  - Chiang Rai
  - Nakhon Sawan
  - Ratchaburi
  - Surat Thani
- Thare and Nonseng (Archdiocese, based in Sakon Nakhon)
  - Nakhon Ratchasima
  - Ubon Ratchathani
  - Udon Thani

== Orders and congregations ==
Orders and congregations in Thailand include:

- Brothers of St. Gabriel (Gabrielite Brothers)
- Capuchin Poor Clares
- Camillians
- Congregation of the Holy Infant Jesus
- Congregation of the Most Holy Redeemer
- Congregation of the Sacred Stigmata
- Vincentians
- Daughters of Charity of Saint Vincent de Paul
- Order of Friars Minor
- Order of Preachers (Dominicans)
- Institute of the Brothers of the Christian Schools (De La Salle Brothers)
- Daughters of the Cross
- Marist Brothers of the Schools
- Oblates of Mary Immaculate
- Order of the Brothers of the Blessed Virgin Mary of Mount Carmel
- Pontifical Institute for Foreign Missions
- Salesian Sisters of Don Bosco
- Society of Jesus
- Society of Mary
- Salesians of Don Bosco
- Society of the Divine Word
- Ursulines
- Montfort Missionaries
- Montfort Brothers of St. Gabriel

== See also ==
- Christianity in Thailand
- Khana Lueat Thai
- List of Catholic dioceses in Thailand
- List of Catholic dioceses (structured view) § Episcopal Conference of Thailand
- Martyrs of Songkhon
- Saint Camillus Foundation
