= Diocese of Chiang Mai =

Latin Catholic diocese in Thailand

Diocese of Chiang Mai Dioecesis Chiangmaiensis สังฆมณฑลเชียงใหม่
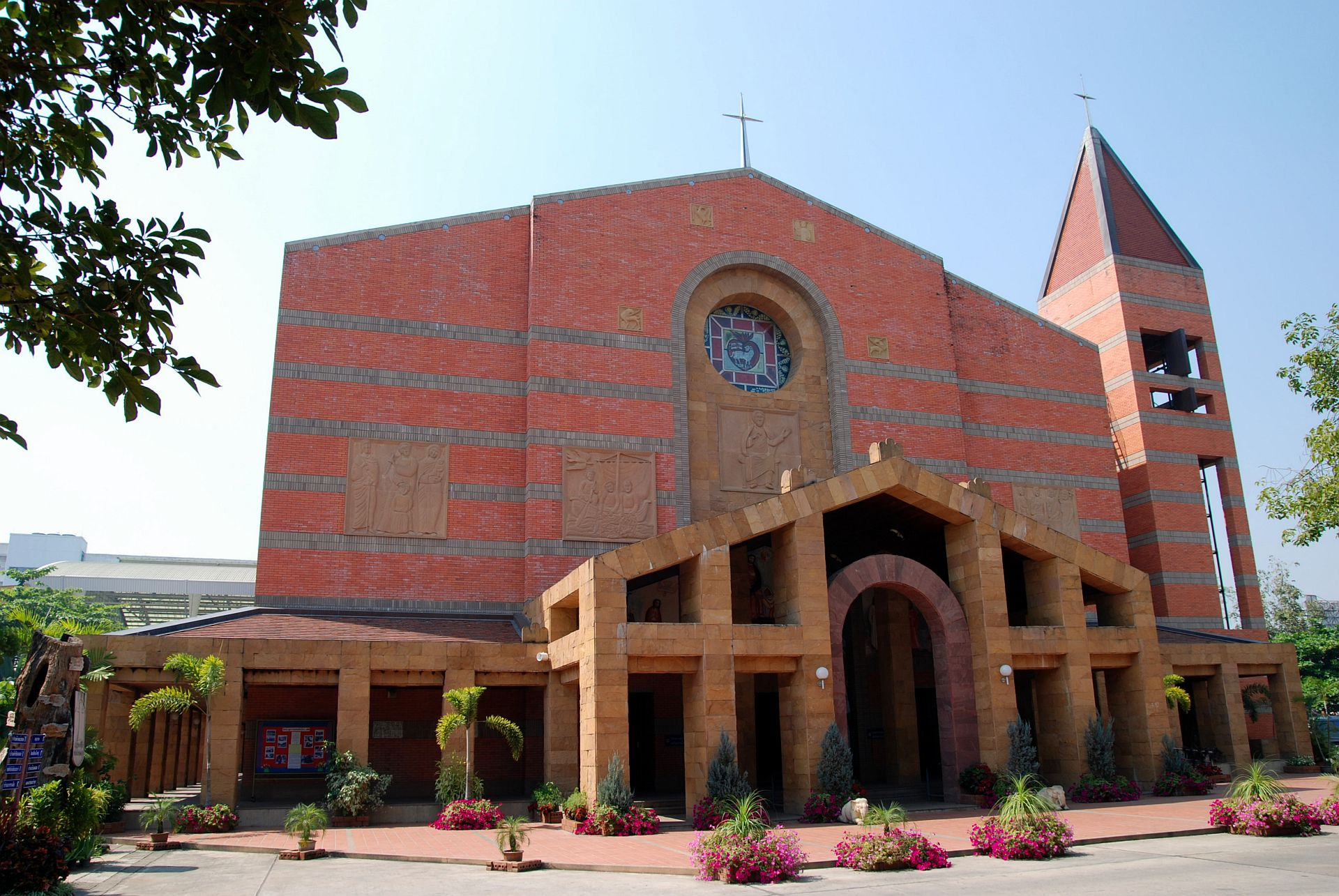
- Cathedral of the Sacred Heart

Location
- Country: Thailand
- Metropolitan: Bangkok

Statistics
- Area: 48,013 km^{2} (18,538 sq mi)
- Population: Total; Catholics: (as of 2018); 3,025,649; 50,913 (1.7%)
- Parishes: 31
- Congregations: 32
- Schools: 9

Information
- Denomination: Catholic
- Sui iuris church: Latin Church
- Rite: Roman Rite
- Cathedral: Sacred Heart Cathedral, Chiang Mai
- Secular priests: 47

Current leadership
- Pope: Leo XIV
- Bishop: Peter Suphot Roeksujarit
- Metropolitan Archbishop: Francis Xavier Vira Arpondratana

Map

The Diocese of Chiang Mai (Dioecesis Chiangmaiensis, Thai: สังฆมณฑลเชียงใหม่) in northern Thailand is a Latin Catholic suffragan diocese of the Archdiocese of Bangkok. Bishop Francis Xavier Vira Arpondratana was appointed leader of the Diocese of Chiang Mai.

The Chiang Mai Diocese is composed of four provinces in the northern region of Thailand: Chiang Mai, Mae Hong Son, Lamphun, and Lampang (except Ngao District). The diocese covers a land area of 48,013 square kilometers with a total population of 5,709,443. As of 2014, there are 68,975 Catholics with 15,080 Catechumens. There are 47 parishes with 519 minor churches or village chapels, eight schools run by religious institutes, seven diocesan schools and 760 Catholic villages. There are 94 priests, 16 religious brothers, 158 religious sisters and 819 lay catechists who work in the diocese.

== History ==
The history of the diocese dates back to the time when Siam granted its people the freedom to choose and practice their own religious faith. The followers of various religions were then allowed the freedom to go around and spread their own religious beliefs.

The mission to the northern region of the country started when Bishop Jean-Baptiste Pallegoix instructed Fr. Jean-Baptiste Granjean and Fr. Jean-Baptiste Vachal of the Society of Foreign Missions of Paris (Société des Missions étrangères de Paris or M.E.P.) to take a trip to Chiang Mai for the first time on 5 December 1843. It took them 45 days to reach Chiang Mai on 18 January 1844. At first, they received a warm welcome from the city chieftain but afterwards, the chief grew more unwelcoming. As a result, the two religious fathers abandoned their mission and return to Bangkok.

In 1913, Bishop Rene Perros revived the proposal to establish a center for evangelization in the northern region. In January 1914 he gave this assignment to Fr. Jean-Baptiste Fouillat and Fr. Joseph Broizat, who traveled to Chiang Mai. After exploring the possibilities of performing missionary activities in the area, they wrote to the bishop that the situation in Chiang Mai looked auspicious. They later bought a six hectare piece of land in the southern part of the city near the Ping River.

Bishop Rene Perros' dream was to build a catholic mission in the north. In 1930, Bishop Perros brought Father George Mirabel to the mission together with a Thai priest, Father Nicholas Bunkerd Kitbamrung (who is now recognized as Blessed Nicholas Bunkerd Kitbamrung, Martyr, by the Catholic Church), to start the work of evangelization in Chiang Mai. They reached Chiang Mai on 18 January 1931 and stayed with the Desousa family. Their work spread the Catholic faith. Missionary activities in other provinces also started to bear fruit in the 1930s.

The 1950s and 1960s were decades of progress in spreading the Catholic faith. Various congregations initiated missionary activities. A number of Catholic schools and churches were built while parishes and areas of apostolate and pastoral work were defined.

On 17 November 1959, the northern region mission was erected as the Apostolic Prefecture of Chiang Mai with Bishop Lucien Lacoste as its first bishop and head of the local church. The Apostolic Prefecture of Chiang Mai was elevated into a diocese on 18 December 1965.

After the resignation of Bishop Lucien Lacoste on 14 September 1975, Bishop Robert Rattana Bamrungtrakul was installed as the head of the Diocese of Chiang Mai. Bishop Joseph Sangval Surasarang was installed in the office as the head of the diocese on 25 January 1987.

At present, the entire Diocese of Chiang Mai is under the leadership of His Excellency Bishop Francis Xavier Vira Arpondratana, who received his episcopal ordination on 1 May 2009.

Until 2018 Chiang Mai Diocese included eight provinces: Chiang Mai, Chiang Rai, Lamphun, Lampang, Phayao, Phrae, Nan, and Mae Hong Son. Of a total population of 5.7 million, the number of Catholics has grown to 68,975 along with 15,080 catechumens who are preparing themselves to receive the sacrament of baptism. Ninety-four priests, 16 religious brothers, 153 nuns and 151 catechists are at work in the diocese.

Over the years, 518 chapels were built in the diocese's 47 parishes. Serving as the seat of the Catholic missions in the northern region of Thailand, the entire diocese covers a total land area of 85,852 square kilometers covering all eight Northern provinces: Chiang Mai, Chiang Rai, Nan, Phayao, Phrae, Mae Hong Son, Lampang and Lamphun.

In 25 April 2018 from the territory of the diocese was spring off the new circumscription, the Diocese of Chiang Rai.

== Cathedral ==
The principal church of the diocese is the Cathedral of the Sacred Heart (Thai: อาสนวิหารพระหฤทัย; Asana Wihan Phra HaRueThai; location 18°46′30.5″N 99°0′11.2″E) in Chiang Mai. The current church, already the third cathedral building of the diocese, was inaugurated on 30 October 1999. The first Sacred Heart church was built in 1931. Shortly before the elevation to a diocese, a new, and larger, church was inaugurated on 28 February 1965.

The Sacred Heart College and the kindergarten school that surround the church building were added later in 2475 BE (1932 CE). Originally there were 40 students, now there are over 4,000. In the last few years an English program has been created. This currently has just over 100 students. Each class is small, around 16 students or so, and has two teachers: a native Thai-speaking teacher and a native English-speaking teacher. Whilst Sacred Heart College is a private school, its prices are controlled by the government and are lower than international private schools in the area. Students range from pre-school to university age.

== Bishops ==
- Peter Suphot Roeksujarit: 7 May 2026 – present
- Francis Xavier Vira Arpondratana: 1 May 2009 – 11 January 2025 (appointed Archbishop of Bangkok)
- Joseph Surasarang: 6 January 1987 - 10 February 2009 (resigned)
- Robert Ratna Bamrungtrakul: 28 April 1975 - 17 October 1986 (resigned)
- 1959-1975 the prefecture and later diocese was administered by Bf. Lucien Bernard Lacoste, Bishop of Dali.

== See also ==
- Catholic Church in Thailand
