= Francis Xavier Vira Arpondratana =

Thai bishop

The Most Reverend Francis Xavier Vira Arpondratana
- Archbishop of Bangkok
- Native name: ฟรังซิสเซเวียร์ วีระ อาภรณ์รัตน์
- Church: Catholic Church
- Archdiocese: Bangkok
- See: Bangkok
- Appointed: 11 January 2025
- Installed: 2 March 2025
- Predecessor: Francis Xavier Kriengsak Kovitvanij
- Other post: President of the Catholic Bishops’ Conference of Thailand (2025-)
- Previous post: Bishop of Chiang Mai (2009-2025)

Orders
- Ordination: 7 June 1981 by Michael Michai Kitbunchu
- Consecration: 1 May 2009 by Michael Michai Kitbunchu

Personal details
- Born: Francis Xavier Vira Arpondratana; 3 October 1955 (age 71) Sam Sen, Bangkok, Thailand
- Motto: Omnia facio propter evangelium
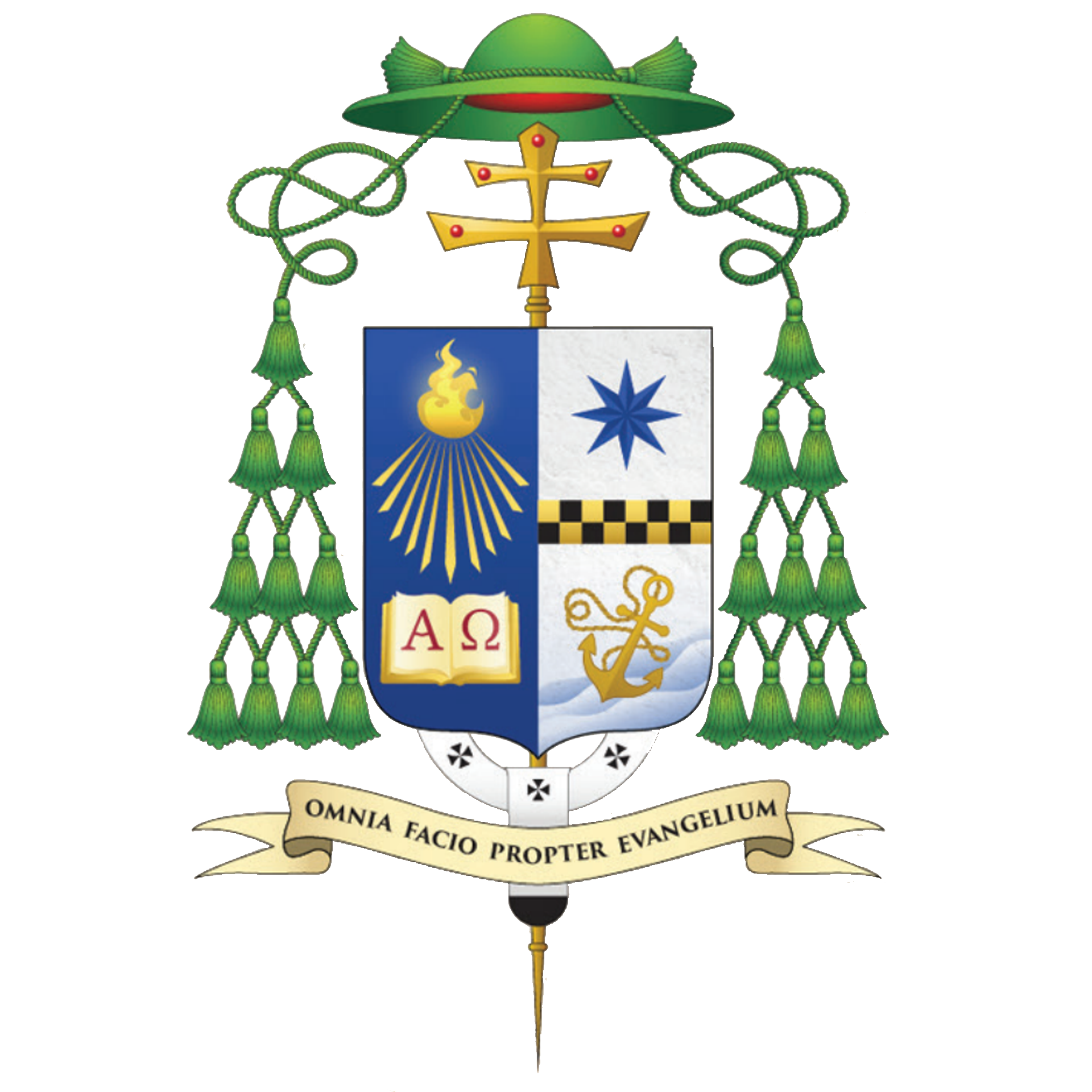
- Coat of arms: Francis Xavier Vira Arpondratana's coat of arms

Francis Xavier Vira Arpondratana (Thai: ฟรังซิสเซเวียร์ วีระ อาภรณ์รัตน์; RTGS: Wira A-phonrat; born October 3, 1955) is an Archbishop of Bangkok, Thailand, appointed on January 11, 2025.

== Biography ==
Born in Sam Sen, Bangkok, Francis Xavier Vira Arpondratana was ordained a priest for the Archdiocese of Bangkok on June 7, 1981, by then Archbishop Michael Michai Kitbunchu. He was the vice-rector of St. Joseph's Minor Seminary in Sampran from 1981 to 1985. He went to study Youth Pastoral Ministry and Catechesis at Salesian University in Rome from 1985 to 1988. He then served as a Director of the Diocesan Catechesis Centre until his appointment as bishop (1988–2009). He also serves as Secretary of the Episcopal Commission for Catechesis. He was also a chaplain of St. Joseph Convent school from 1990 to 1998.

On February 10, 2009, Pope Benedict XVI appointed him as Bishop of Chiang Mai. He was ordained on May 1, 2009, by Cardinal Michael Michai Kitbunchu. Co-consecrators were the Apostolic nuncio in Thailand, Archbishop Salvatore Pennacchio, and Joseph Sangval Surasarang, former Bishop of Chiang Mai.

Catholic Church titles
Preceded by Joseph Sangval Surasarang	Diocese of Chiang Mai; 10 February 2009–incumbent	Succeeded by incumbent
