= Michael Michai Kitbunchu =

Thai cardinal (born 1929)

His Eminence: Michael Michai Kitbunchu; ไมเกิ้ล มีชัย กิจบุญชู
- Cardinal, Archbishop Emeritus of Bangkok
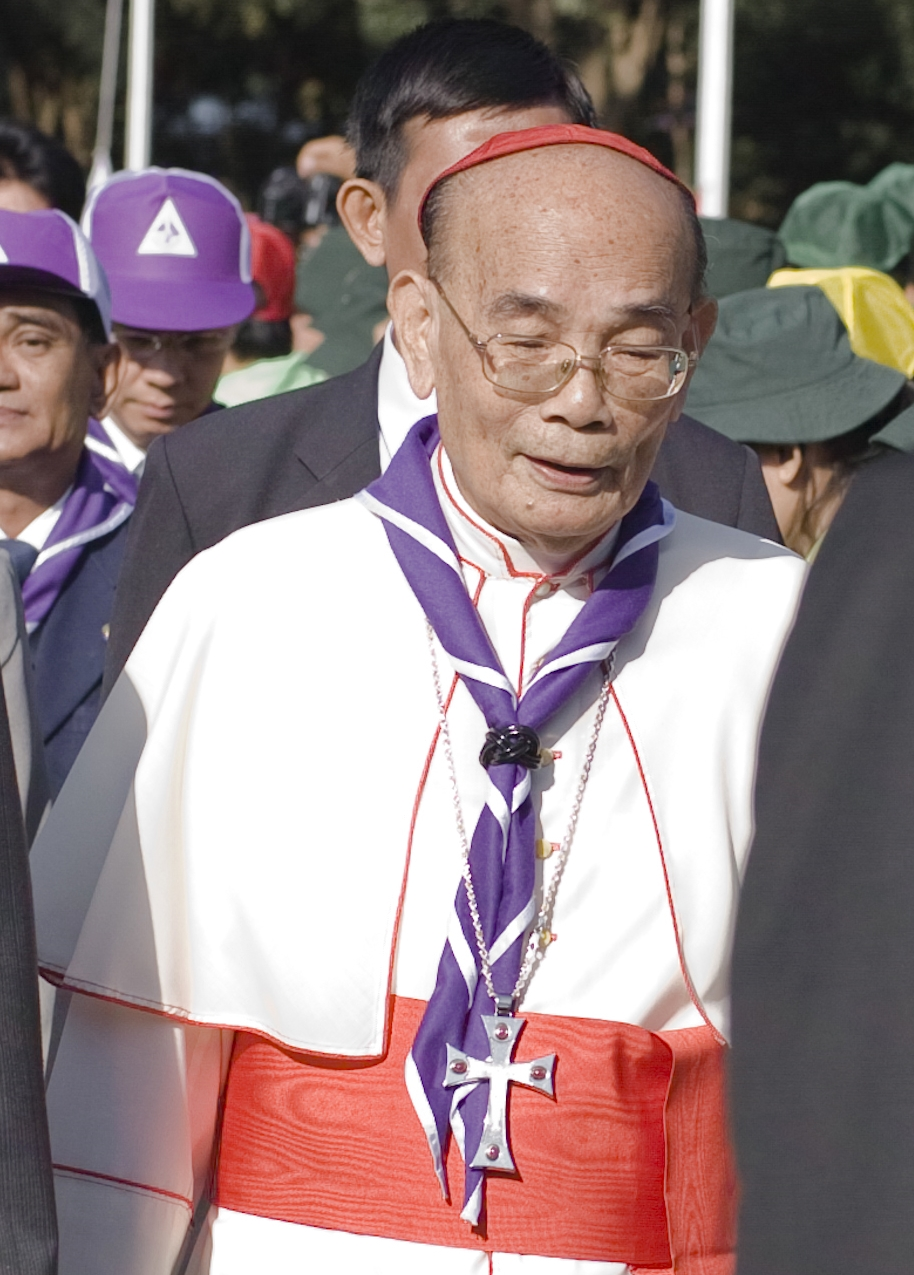
- Cardinal Kitbunchu in 2010
- See: Bangkok
- Appointed: 18 December 1972
- Installed: 3 June 1973
- Term ended: 14 May 2009
- Predecessor: Joseph Khiamsun Nittayo
- Successor: Francis Xavier Kriengsak Kovithavanij
- Other posts: Cardinal-Priest of San Lorenzo in Panisperna (since 1983); Protopriest of the College of Cardinals (since 2016)

Orders
- Ordination: 20 December 1959 by Gregorio Pietro Agagianian
- Consecration: 3 June 1973 by Joseph Khiamsun Nittayo
- Created cardinal: 2 February 1983 by Pope John Paul II
- Rank: Cardinal-Priest

Personal details
- Born: 25 January 1929 (age 97) Sam Phran, Nakhon Pathom, Siam
- Denomination: Catholic
- Parents: Joseph Yuhong Kitbunchu (deceased); Maria Klueab Kitbunchu (deceased)
- Motto: Through the Cross to light (Per crucem ad lucem)
- Coat of arms

Michael Michai Kitbunchu (Thai: ไมเกิ้ล มีชัย กิจบุญชู, pronounced [māj.kɤ̂l mīː.t͡ɕʰāj kìt.būn.t͡ɕʰūː, māj.kɤ̂ɫ-, māj.kɤ̂n-]; born 25 January 1929) is a Thai prelate of the Catholic Church. He served as Archbishop of Bangkok from 1973 to 2009 and was made a cardinal in 1983. He has been the Protopriest of the College of Cardinals since 14 December 2016. He is the first cardinal from Thailand. He was president of the Thai Episcopal Conference from 1979 to 1982 and from 2000 to 2006. As of 2026, Kitbunchu is the longest serving cardinal.

== Early life and ministry ==
Kitbunchu was born in Sam Phran, a district of the Nakhon Pathom Province, to parents of ethnic Chinese descent and studied at the minor seminary of Si Racha. He then furthered his studies at the Pontifical Urbaniana University in Rome, where he obtained a licentiate in both philosophy and theology. While in Rome, he was ordained to the priesthood by Cardinal Grégoire-Pierre Agagianian on 20 December 1959.

He returned to Thailand and served as assistant pastor and then pastor in Bang Kham, and later became pastor of Calvary Parish in Bangkok. He was also an archdiocesan consultor and served as rector of the metropolitan seminary of Bangkok from 1965 to 1972.

== Episcopal career ==
On 18 December 1972, Pope Paul VI appointed Kitbunchu the second Archbishop of Bangkok. He received his episcopal consecration on 3 June 1973 from Archbishop Joseph Khiamsun Nittayo, with Bishops Lawrence Thienchai Samanchit and Michel-Auguste–Marie Langer, MEP, serving as co-consecrators. He served as President of the Thai Episcopal Conference from 1979 to 1982, and again from 2000 to 2006.

Pope John Paul II created him Cardinal-Priest of San Lorenzo in Panisperna in the consistory of 2 February 1983; he was the first cardinal from Thailand. Kitbunchu was one of the cardinal electors who participated in the 2005 papal conclave that selected Pope Benedict XVI. He denied funeral Masses to drug traffickers, saying that such people "destroy society" and engage in "acts of indirect murder." He once expressed his opposition to abortion by saying, "Abortion is a great crime, because the one who should protect the child in her womb becomes the one who destroys the child."

During the 2006 political crisis in his Thailand, Kitbunchu called for unity, saying, "All Thai people are patriotic and want the country to progress and develop on all fields, but now the political crisis has disturbed and worried the people." He also asked Thais to "correct what is wrong and forgive each other."

Kitbunchu resigned from his position as Archbishop of Bangkok on 14 May 2009. At the time of his retirement, he was the oldest active head of an archdiocese in the Latin Church. In addition to his native language, Central Thai (official and national) and his ethnic Chinese dialect of Teochew, he can also speak other languages such as Latin, English, Italian, French and Standard Mandarin.

From the death of Roger Etchegaray in 2019, Kitbunchu and Alexandre do Nascimento were tied as the longest-tenured members of the College of Cardinals, both having been appointed in 1983. After do Nascimento's death on 28 September 2024, Kitbunchu became the sole longest-tenured member of the College.

Catholic Church titles
Preceded by Joseph Khiamsun Nittayo	Archbishop of Bangkok; 18 December 1972 – 14 May 2009	Succeeded by Kriengsak Kovitvanit
Preceded by Antonio Caggiano	Cardinal Priest of San Lorenzo in Panisperna; 2 February 1983 –	Incumbent
Preceded by Paulo Evaristo Arns	Cardinal Protopriest; 14 December 2016 –	Incumbent
