= Deaths in December 2010 =

The following is a list of notable deaths in December 2010.

Entries for each day are listed alphabetically by surname. A typical entry lists information in the following sequence:

- Name, age, country of citizenship at birth, subsequent country of citizenship (if applicable), reason for notability, cause of death (if known), and reference.

== December 2010 ==
=== 1 ===
- Berlenti Abdul Hamid, 75, Egyptian actress, stroke.
- W. Geoffrey Arnott, 80, British Hellenist.
- Adriaan Blaauw, 96, Dutch astronomer.
- Helen Boatwright, 94, American soprano, complications from a fall.
- Hillard Elkins, 81, American talent manager and film producer (Alice's Restaurant, Richard Pryor: Live in Concert), heart attack.
- Frank S. Emi, 94, American member of the Fair Play Committee.
- Shahla Jahed, 41, Iranian convicted murderer, executed by hanging.
- Charles N. Millican, 94, American academic, founding president of the University of Central Florida.
- Richard P. Myers, 62, American politician, member of the Illinois House of Representatives (1995–2010), prostate cancer.
- Sir Peter Wakefeld, 88, British diplomat.

=== 2 ===
- Michael Bunluen Mansap, 81, Thai Roman Catholic prelate, Bishop of Ubon Ratchathani (1976–2006).
- Michele Giordano, 80, Italian Roman Catholic cardinal, Archbishop of Naples (1987–2006).
- Chane't Johnson, 34, American actress, heart attack.
- Lee Huan, 93, Taiwanese politician, Premier of the Republic of China (1989–1990), cardiopulmonary failure.
- Ernâni Lopes, 68, Portuguese politician, Minister of Finance (1983–1985).
- Lauri Tamminen, 91, Finnish Olympic athlete.

=== 3 ===
- Abdumalik Bahori, 83, Tajikistani writer.
- Marvin Bass, 91, American college football player and coach.
- Hugues Cuénod, 108, Swiss tenor.
- Phil Jasner, 68, American sportswriter, cancer.
- Elaine Kaufman, 81, American restaurateur, founder of Elaine's, emphysema and pulmonary hypertension.
- Ma Ning, 88, Chinese major general, Commander of the PLA Air Force (1973–1977).
- Donald Pass, 80, British abstract painter.
- José Ramos Delgado, 75, Argentine footballer and coach, Alzheimer's disease.
- Ron Santo, 70, American baseball player and broadcaster (Chicago Cubs), member of MLB Hall of Fame, complications from diabetes and bladder cancer.
- Skip Young, 59, American professional wrestler.

=== 4 ===
- Manish Acharya, 43, Indian film director and actor, fall from horse.
- Mohamed Mahbub Alam, 38, Bangladeshi Olympic sprinter, road accident.
- Pamela Bryant, 51, American model, actress (H.O.T.S.), and Playboy Playmate of the Month (April 1978), natural causes.
- Pierre de Beaumont, 96, Franco-American founder of Brookstone.
- Lia Dorana, 92, Dutch actress and comedian.
- Cathy Harvin, 56, American politician, member of the South Carolina House of Representatives (since 2006), breast cancer.
- Torodd Hauer, 88, Norwegian Olympic speed skater.
- King Curtis Iaukea, 73, American professional wrestler, after long illness.
- Jacques Lafleur, 78, French politician, leader of New Caledonia anti-independence movement.
- Ken Lehman, 82, American baseball player (Brooklyn Dodgers).
- Birthe Nielsen, 84, Danish Olympic sprinter.
- Adrienne Simpson, 67, New Zealand broadcaster and writer.
- Heather Stilwell, 66, Canadian anti-abortion activist and politician, leader of the Christian Heritage Party (1993–1994), breast cancer.
- Dagoberto Suárez Melo, 35, Colombian politician, Governor of Guaviare (2010), car crash.

=== 5 ===
- Albano Albanese, 88, Italian hurdler and high jumper.
- Alan Armer, 88, American Emmy Award-winning television producer (The Fugitive), colon cancer.
- Shamil Burziyev, 25, Russian footballer, car crash.
- David French, 71, Canadian playwright, cancer.
- María Ester Gatti, 92, Uruguayan human rights activist.
- Heda Margolius Kovály, 91, Czech author and Holocaust survivor.
- John Leslie, 65, American pornographic film actor and director, heart attack.
- Don Meredith, 72, American football player (Dallas Cowboys) and commentator (Monday Night Football), brain hemorrhage.
- John Thomas Steinbock, 73, American Roman Catholic prelate, Bishop of Santa Rosa (1987–1991) and Fresno (since 1991), lung cancer.
- Virgílio Teixeira, 93, Portuguese actor (Return of the Seven, The Fall of the Roman Empire, El Cid).

=== 6 ===
- Mariá Álvarez Rios, 91, Cuban composer, pianist and educator.
- Frank Bessac, 88, American anthropologist, stroke.
- Tom Crowe, 88, Irish-born British presenter (BBC Radio 3).
- Hugues Cuénod, 108, Swiss tenor.
- Mark Dailey, 57, American-born Canadian television journalist and announcer, cancer.
- Ambrosio Echebarria Arroita, 88, Spanish Roman Catholic prelate, Bishop of Barbastro-Monzón (1974–1999).
- René Hauss, 82, French footballer.
- Norman Hetherington, 89, Australian cartoonist and television personality.
- Ferenc Keszthelyi, 82, Hungarian Roman Catholic prelate, Bishop of Vác (1992–2003).
- James Thomas Lynn, 83, American politician, Secretary of Housing and Urban Development (1973–1975), complications from a stroke.
- Vic Lynn, 85, Canadian ice hockey player (Chicago Blackhawks, New York Rangers).
- Imre Mathesz, 73, Hungarian footballer and coach, car crash.
- Art Quimby, 77, American college basketball player (UConn).
- Hank Raymonds, 86, American college basketball coach (Marquette), cancer.
- Roy R. Rubottom Jr., 98, American diplomat.
- Martin Russ, 79, American author and United States Marine.
- T. E. Srinivasan, 60, Indian cricketer, brain cancer.
- Júlio Tavares Rebimbas, 88, Portuguese Roman Catholic prelate, Archbishop of Porto (1982–1997).
- Ellen Ugland, 57, Norwegian billionaire.

=== 7 ===
- Murat Akhedzhak, 48, Russian politician, heart attack.
- Peter Andry, 83, Australian-born British record producer (Decca Records, EMI Classics), cancer.
- Muzaffer Atac, 77, Turkish-American physicist.
- John E. Baldwin, 79, British astronomer.
- Hendrik Coetzee, 35, South African kayaker and adventurer, crocodile attack.
- Cardell Camper, 58, American baseball player.
- Elizabeth Edwards, 61, American author, lawyer and political activist, breast cancer.
- Fan Yew Teng, 68, Malaysian politician and human rights activist, cancer.
- John A. Ferraro, 64, American television actor and director, colon cancer.
- Samuel Pailthorpe King, 94, American district court judge (District of Hawaii, 1972–1984), injuries from a fall.
- Art Mahan, 97, American baseball player (Philadelphia Phillies) and college baseball coach (Villanova), heart failure.
- Gus Mercurio, 82, American-born Australian boxing promoter, international boxing judge and actor.
- Volha Samusik, 25, Belarusian rock singer, pneumonia.
- Kari Tapio, 65, Finnish schlager singer, heart attack.
- Federico Vairo, 80, Argentine footballer and coach, stomach cancer.
- Armin Weiss, 83, German chemist and politician.
- Arnold Weiss, 86, German-born American soldier, helped discover Adolf Hitler's will, pneumonia.

=== 8 ===
- Poul Andersen, 82, Danish footballer.
- Murray Armstrong, 94, Canadian ice hockey player (Detroit Red Wings, Toronto Maple Leafs) and coach (University of Denver), complications from a stroke.
- Walter Haeussermann, 96, German-born American rocket scientist, complications from a fall.
- John James, 76, Australian footballer, Brownlow Medallist, stroke.
- Trev Thoms, 60, British guitarist (Inner City Unit, Atomgods), pancreatic cancer.

=== 9 ===
- Roland B. Anderson, 97, American retired major general, Mayor of Naples, Florida (1978–1982).
- John Makepeace Bennett, 89, Australian computer scientist.
- John du Pont, 72, American billionaire and murderer, natural causes.
- Chuck Jordan, 83, American automobile designer (General Motors).
- Alexander Kerst, 86, Austrian actor.
- James Moody, 85, American jazz saxophonist and flautist ("Moody's Mood for Love"), pancreatic cancer.
- Martin Rutty, 50, British entrepreneur, helicopter crash.
- Fausto Sarli, 83, Italian fashion designer.
- Dov Shilansky, 86, Israeli politician, Speaker of the Knesset (1988–1992).
- Thorvald Strömberg, 79, Finnish Olympic sprint canoeist.
- Boris Tishchenko, 71, Russian composer.
- Ángel Torres, 82, Cuban author and historian.

=== 10 ===
- Nicolas Astrinidis, 89, Romanian-born Greek composer, pianist, conductor, and educator.
- Marcel Domingo, 86, French footballer.
- John B. Fenn, 93, American chemist, Nobel laureate.
- J. Michael Hagopian, 97, Ottoman-born American documentary filmmaker.
- George Pickow, 88, American photographer and film-maker.
- Jacques Swaters, 84, Belgian racing driver.

=== 11 ===
- José dos Santos Garcia, 97, Portuguese-born Mozambican Roman Catholic prelate, Bishop of Porto Amélia (1957–1975).
- Dick Hoerner, 88, American football player (Los Angeles Rams), stroke.
- Ronnie McMahon, 68, Irish Olympic equestrian.
- MacKenzie Miller, 89, American racehorse trainer, owner and breeder, Hall of Famer, complications of a stroke.
- Urszula Modrzyńska, 82, Polish actress.
- Roger Nicole, 95, Swiss-born American Evangelical Christian theologian.
- Peter Risi, 60, Swiss footballer, after long illness.
- Gene Spangler, 88, American football player (Detroit Lions).
- Guillermo Squella, 87, Chilean Olympic equestrian.

=== 12 ===
- Manuel Caballero, 79, Venezuelan historian, journalist and author, complications following prostate surgery.
- Jannie Greeff, 75, South African Olympic weightlifter.
- Lachhiman Gurung, 92, Nepalese-born British soldier, recipient of the Victoria Cross.
- Raymond Kalisz, 83, American-born Papuan Roman Catholic prelate, Bishop of Wewak (1980–2002).
- Timothée Malendoma, 75, Central African politician, Prime Minister (1992–1993).
- Ros Mey, 85, Cambodian-born American Buddhist monk and community leader, survivor of Khmer Rouge regime.
- Carleton Naiche-Palmer, 63, American tribal leader, President of the Mescalero Apache (2008–2010).
- Emmanuel Ogoli, 21, Nigerian footballer.
- B. S. Ranga, 93, Indian film director.
- Helen Roberts, 98, British singer and actress.
- William Thompson, 71, British politician, MP for West Tyrone (1997–2001).
- Tom Walkinshaw, 64, British engineer and racing team owner (Tom Walkinshaw Racing, Arrows), cancer.

=== 13 ===
- James Dibble, 87, Australian television news presenter, cancer.
- Claude Foussier, 85, French Olympic sports shooter.
- Maynard W. Glitman, 77, American diplomat, negotiator of the Intermediate-Range Nuclear Forces Treaty, complications from dementia.
- Rick Griffiths, 62, Australian Aboriginal activist and ATSIC commissioner.
- Richard Holbrooke, 69, American diplomat, Ambassador to Germany (1993–1994) and United Nations (1999–2001), complications from aortic dissection.
- Enrique Morente, 67, Spanish flamenco singer.
- Remmy Ongala, 63, Tanzanian singer.
- Karen Sortito, 49, American movie marketing executive, cancer.
- Takeshi Watabe, 74, Japanese voice actor (Cowboy Bebop, Fist of the North Star, Naruto), pneumonia.

=== 14 ===
- Florence Armstrong, 82, Irish teacher.
- Håkon Christie, 88, Norwegian architect.
- Timothy Davlin, 53, American politician, Mayor of Springfield, Illinois (since 2003), suicide by gunshot.
- Robyn Dawes, 74, American psychologist and professor.
- Adalbert Eledui, 62, Palauan senator and conservationist, after long illness.
- Ruth Park, 93, New Zealand-born Australian novelist.
- Neva Patterson, 90, American actress (An Affair to Remember, All the President's Men), complications from a broken hip.
- Pascal Rakotomavo, 76, Malagasy politician, Prime Minister (1997–1998), cardiovascular attack.
- Dale Roberts, 24, English footballer (Rushden & Diamonds), suicide by hanging.
- Alberto Segado, 66, Argentine actor (Asesinato en el Senado de la Nación).

=== 15 ===
- Ken Ablack, 91, Trinidadian cricket player.
- Téclaire Bille, 22, Equatoguinean football player, road accident.
- Domini Blythe, 63, British-born Canadian stage and film actress (Mount Royal, Search for Tomorrow), cancer.
- Boyas, 41, Equatoguinean football player and manager, road accident.
- Rachel Bromwich, 95, British scholar.
- Carlos Pinto Coelho, 66, Portuguese journalist and television personality, complications from aortic surgery.
- Bernard Patrick Devlin, 89, Irish-born Roman Catholic Bishop of Gibraltar (1985–1998).
- Blake Edwards, 88, American film director (The Pink Panther, Breakfast at Tiffany's, Victor/Victoria) and screenwriter, pneumonia.
- Anthony Enahoro, 87, Nigerian political activist.
- Bob Feller, 92, American baseball player (Cleveland Indians), member of Baseball Hall of Fame, leukemia.
- Teuvo Hatunen, 66, Finnish Olympic skier.
- Stan Heal, 90, Australian footballer, member of the Australian Football Hall of Fame.
- Solange Michel, 98, French mezzo-soprano.
- Tom Newnham, 84, New Zealand political activist and educationalist, cancer.
- Jean Rollin, 72, French film director, actor and novelist, after long illness.
- Eugene Victor Wolfenstein, 70, American social theorist and psychoanalyst, professor of political science (UCLA), cancer.

=== 16 ===
- Irwin Abrams, 96, American historian.
- Richard Adeney, 90, British flautist.
- Frank Baldino Jr., 57, American pharmacologist, founder of the pharmaceutical firm Cephalon, leukemia.
- Melvin E. Biddle, 87, American Medal of Honor recipient.
- John David Duty, 58, American convicted murderer, first person executed in the US using pentobarbital, executed by lethal injection.
- François Gayot, 83, Haitian Roman Catholic prelate, Archbishop of Cap-Haïtien (1974–2003).
- Reg Hope, 83, Australian politician, member of the Tasmanian Legislative Council (1979–1997).
- Sterling Lyon, 83, Canadian politician, Premier of Manitoba (1977–1981).
- Mary Jane Odell, 87, American journalist, lecturer, and politician.
- E. Gene Smith, 74, American Tibetologist.
- A. T. Q. Stewart, 81, Northern Irish historian.
- Karen Tuttle, 90, American viola teacher, after long illness.

=== 17 ===
- Glen Adams, 65, Jamaican musician.
- Silvino Barsana Agudo, 93, Filipino lawyer and businessman.
- Arne Arnesen, 82, Norwegian diplomat and politician.
- Captain Beefheart, 69, American rock musician and artist (Trout Mask Replica), complications from multiple sclerosis.
- Ralph Coates, 64, English footballer (Burnley, Tottenham Hotspur, Leyton Orient, England), stroke.
- Walt Dropo, 87, American baseball player (Boston Red Sox, Baltimore Orioles).
- Dick Gibson, 92, English racing driver.
- Eugene Goldwasser, 88, American scientist, first to purify EPO extracts, prostate cancer.
- Nikos Papatakis, 92, Greek film director.
- Martti Pennanen, 87, Finnish film and stage actor.
- Lina Romay, 91, American actress and singer.
- María Jesús San Segundo, 52, Spanish diplomat, economist and academic, Minister of Education and Science (2004–2006), cancer.
- Sulaiman Taha, 59, Malaysian politician, member of the Johor State Legislative Assembly.
- Mikhail Umansky, 58, Russian-born German chess grandmaster.

=== 18 ===
- Rudolf Ahlswede, 72, German mathematician.
- John Bukovsky, 86, Slovak-born American Roman Catholic prelate, Apostolic Nuncio to Romania (1990–1994) and Russia (1994–2000).
- Phil Cavarretta, 94, American baseball player (Chicago Cubs, Chicago White Sox), complications from a stroke.
- Ann Cindric, 88, American AAGPBL baseball player.
- Morris L. Cohen, 83, American legal librarian, leukemia.
- Clay Cole, 72, American television host (The Clay Cole Show) and DJ.
- Norberto Díaz, 58, Argentine actor.
- Rafael Fernández Álvarez, 97, Spanish politician, President of the Regional Council (1978–1981), first President of Asturias (1981–1983).
- Steven W. Fisher, 64, American judge, cancer.
- Max Jammer, 95, Israeli physicist.
- Tasso Kavadia, 89, Greek actress and artist.
- Gerard Mansell, 89, British broadcasting executive.
- Tommaso Padoa-Schioppa, 70, Italian banker and politician, Minister of Economy and Finance (2006–2008), proponent of the Euro, heart attack.
- James Pickles, 85, English circuit judge and tabloid columnist.
- Nash Roberts, 92, American television meteorologist.
- Jacqueline de Romilly, 97, French philologist.
- Eric Schmertz, 84, American labor negotiator, Dean of the Hofstra University School of Law.

=== 19 ===
- Chris Condon, 88, American cinematographer (Jaws 3-D), 3D lens inventor.
- LeGrand R. Curtis, 86, American Elder of the Church of Jesus Christ of Latter-day Saints (LDS Church).
- Lupe Gigliotti, 84, Brazilian actress, lung cancer.
- Anthony Howard, 76, British journalist, broadcaster and editor (New Statesman).
- Murali Kuttan, 56, Indian athlete, Asian Games medalist.
- Lucien Mathys, 86, Belgian cyclist.
- Trudy Pitts, 78, American jazz organist, pianist and vocalist, pancreatic cancer.
- Nuh al-Qudah, 71, Jordanian Muslim scholar, Grand Mufti of Jordan (2007–2010).
- Roy Romain, 92, British Olympic swimmer, stroke.
- Helen Maynor Scheirbeck, 75, American educator and activist, stroke.
- Mark A. Smith, 45, British-born American professor of pathology, hit and run accident.

=== 20 ===
- John Alldis, 81, British chorus master and conductor.
- Donna Atwood, 85, American figure skater, respiratory problems.
- Aamer Bashir, 38, Pakistani cricketer, cancer.
- Jacqueline Courtney, 64, American actress (Another World, One Life to Live), metastatic melanoma.
- Giovanni Ferrofino, 98, Italian Roman Catholic prelate, Apostolic Nuncio to Haiti (1960–1965) and to Ecuador (1965–1970)
- Gordon Foster, 89, Irish mathematician.
- Brian Hanrahan, 61, British journalist, cancer.
- Steve Landesberg, 74, American actor (Barney Miller, Forgetting Sarah Marshall, Head Case), colorectal cancer.
- James Mann, 90, American politician, U.S. Representative from South Carolina (1969–1979), Alzheimer's disease.
- Magnolia Shorty, 28, American rapper, shot.
- Gérandale Télusma, 38, Haitian lawyer and politician, deputy, car accident.
- Patricia Thompson, 63, American television producer, Emmy Award-winning documentary director, cerebral hemorrhage.

=== 21 ===
- Enzo Bearzot, 83, Italian World Cup-winning football manager and player.
- W. Pete Cunningham, 81, American politician, Member of the North Carolina House of Representatives (1987–2008).
- Elmo Gideon, 86, American artist and sculptor.
- David Hennessy, 3rd Baron Windlesham, 78, British politician and television executive.
- Oleksandr Kovalenko, 34, Ukrainian footballer (Dnipro, Shakhtar) and referee, suicide by jumping.
- Bertie Lewis, 90, British World War II RAF airman and anti-war campaigner.
- Marcia Lewis, 72, American musical theatre actress and singer, cancer.
- Catalina Speroni, 72, Argentine actress.
- Jack Tracy, 83, American editor (Down Beat) and music producer (Chess, Mercury).

=== 22 ===
- Jean Chamant, 97, French minister, senator (1977–1995).
- David Cockayne, 68, British physicist.
- Fred Foy, 89, American radio and television announcer (The Lone Ranger), natural causes.
- Gianna Galli, 75, Italian operatic soprano.
- Nalini Jaywant, 84, Indian actress.
- John Macreadie, 64, Scottish trade unionist, brain tumour.
- Vivi Markussen, 71, Danish Olympic sprinter.
- Alan Shallcross, 78, British television producer.

=== 23 ===
- Donald Allchin, 80, British Anglican priest and theologian
- Gordon P. Allen, 81, American politician.
- Celestino Rocha da Costa, 72, São Toméan politician, Prime Minister (1988–1991).
- Jayaben Desai, 77, Indian-born British trade unionist (Grunwick dispute).
- William Fones, 93, American jurist, Tennessee Supreme Court justice (1973–1990).
- Fred Hargesheimer, 94, American USAAF pilot and philanthropist in West New Britain Province, Papua New Guinea.
- Ibrahim Ismail, 88, Malaysian army general.
- K. Karunakaran, 92, Indian politician, Chief Minister of Kerala (1977; 1981–1987; 1991–1995), stroke.
- Kenneth B. Lee, 88, American politician, Speaker of the Pennsylvania House of Representatives (1967–1968; 1973–1974), melanoma.
- José Antonio Momeñe, 70, Spanish Olympic cyclist.
- Janine Pommy Vega, 68, American Beat Generation poet.

=== 24 ===
- Edsel Albert Ammons, 86, American bishop.
- Elisabeth Beresford, 84, British children's author, creator of The Wombles.
- Philip Burton Jr., 76, American documentary filmmaker, Alzheimer's disease.
- Jean-Marie Charpentier, 71, French architect and urban planner.
- Ljubomir Ćipranić, 74, Serbian actor.
- Frances Ginsberg, 55, American operatic soprano, ovarian cancer.
- Per Karstensen, 95, Norwegian politician.
- David Kenworthy, 11th Baron Strabolgi, 96, British peer, Member of the House of Lords.
- John Matsko, 77, American football player (Michigan State Spartans).
- Frans de Munck, 88, Dutch footballer.
- Roy Neuberger, 107, American financier and arts patron.
- José Orlandis, 92, Spanish church historian and priest.
- Orestes Quércia, 72, Brazilian politician, Governor of São Paulo (1987–1991), prostate cancer.
- Neil Rogers, 68, American radio personality, heart failure.
- Myrna Smith, 69, American singer and songwriter (Sweet Inspirations), kidney failure.
- Yuri Starunsky, 65, Russian Olympic silver (1976) and bronze (1972) medal-winning volleyball player, stroke.
- Eino Tamberg, 80, Estonian composer.
- Viper, 51, American pornographic actress, lung cancer.
- John Warhola, 85, American museum founder (The Andy Warhol Museum), brother of Andy Warhol, pneumonia.

=== 25 ===
- Aron Abrams, 50, American screenwriter and television producer (King of the Hill, Everybody Hates Chris, 3rd Rock from the Sun).
- Joan Alexander, 98, Scottish singer.
- Kevin Boyle, 67, Northern Irish law professor and human rights activist, cancer.
- Gavin Brown, 68, Australian academic, Vice-Chancellor of the University of Sydney (1996–2008).
- John Bulaitis, 77, British-born Lithuanian Roman Catholic prelate, Apostolic Nuncio to Albania (1997–2008).
- Bud Greenspan, 84, American Olympic filmmaker, Parkinson's disease.
- Robert E. Kennedy, 95, American university president (California Polytechnic).
- Eric Laakso, 54, American football player (Miami Dolphins), natural causes. (body found on this date)
- Luis Manresa Formosa, 95, Guatemalan Roman Catholic prelate, Bishop of Los Altos Quetzaltenango-Totonicapán (1955–1979).
- Jorge Mayer, 95, Argentine Roman Catholic prelate, Archbishop of Bahía Blanca (1972–1991).
- Sir Iain Noble, 75, Scottish businessman.
- Karl Olson, 80, American baseball player.
- Carlos Andrés Pérez, 88, Venezuelan politician, President (1974–1979; 1989–1993), heart attack.
- Qian Yunhui, 53, Chinese dissident.
- A. N. Ray, 98, Indian jurist, Chief Justice of the Supreme Court of India (1973–1977).
- Maurice Rioli, 53, Australian VFL player and politician, member of the NT Legislative Assembly for Arafura (1992–2001), heart attack.
- Irina Zuykova, 52, Soviet Olympic equestrian.

=== 26 ===
- John Archibald Armstrong, 93, Canadian business executive.
- Salvador Jorge Blanco, 84, Dominican Republic politician, President (1982–1986).
- Wade Crane, 66, American pool player, automobile accident.
- Geraldine Doyle, 86, American factory worker, possible inspiration for the "We Can Do It!" poster.
- Jonas Falk, 66, Swedish character actor.
- Eugene K. Garfield, 74, American founder of the Auto-Train Corporation, esophageal cancer.
- Albert Ghiorso, 95, American nuclear scientist, co-discovered twelve chemical elements.
- Miguel Maria Giambelli, 90, Brazilian Roman Catholic prelate, Bishop of Bragança do Pará (1980–1996).
- Bill Jones, 89, English international footballer, natural causes.
- Matthew Lipman, 87, American educator.
- Robert Macauley, 87, American manufacturer, founder of AmeriCares, emphysema.
- Teena Marie, 54, American singer and composer.
- Ian Samuel, 95, British Royal Air Force pilot and diplomat.
- Jessie Rae Scott, 81, American gubernatorial First Lady (1969–1973), widow of North Carolina governor Bob Scott, after long illness.
- Bernard Wilson, 64, American singer (Harold Melvin & the Blue Notes), stroke and heart attack.

=== 27 ===
- Keith Andrew, 81, English cricketer.
- Walter Balmer, 62, Swiss footballer.
- Bernard-Pierre Donnadieu, 61, French actor, cancer.
- Raphael Hillyer, 96, American violist, founding member of the Juilliard String Quartet, heart failure.
- Alfred E. Kahn, 93, American economist, cancer.
- Maureen Lehane, 78, British singer and music festival organiser.
- Jack Leslie, 90, Canadian politician, Mayor of Calgary (1965–1969).
- Grant McCune, 67, American visual effects artist (Star Wars, Star Trek: The Motion Picture, Speed), Oscar winner (1978), pancreatic cancer.
- Michael O'Pake, 70, American politician, longest serving member of the Pennsylvania State Senate (since 1973), complications from surgery.
- Sir David Scott, 91, British diplomat.

=== 28 ===
- Atina Bojadži, 66, Macedonian marathon swimmer, first Yugoslavian woman to swim across the English Channel.
- Frank Bonilla, 85, American academic of Puerto Rican descent, long illness.
- Bennie Briscoe, 67, American boxer.
- Avi Cohen, 54, Israeli footballer, motorcycle accident.
- Chris Colmer, 30, American college football player (NC State)
- Denis Dutton, 66, American-born entrepreneur and philosopher, creator of Arts & Letters Daily and Bad Writing Contest, prostate cancer.
- Donald Fraser, 83, American politician.
- Joseph Grech, 62, Maltese-born Australian Roman Catholic prelate, Bishop of Sandhurst (since 2001), blood disorder
- Fred Heron, 66, American football player (St. Louis Cardinals).
- Brandon Joyce, 26, American football player (St. Louis Rams, Minnesota Vikings), shot.
- Gene Kelton, 55, American blues, rock and rockabilly singer and guitarist, multiple injuries from vehicle collision.
- Bill Lajoie, 76, American baseball scout and executive (Detroit Tigers).
- Zeferino Nandayapa, 79, Mexican classical marimbist, injuries from a fall.
- Terry Peder Rasmussen, 67, American serial killer.
- Hideko Takamine, 86, Japanese actress.
- Billy Taylor, 89, American jazz pianist and composer (I Wish I Knew How It Would Feel to Be Free), heart attack.
- Jeff Taylor, 80, English footballer.
- Agathe von Trapp, 97, Austrian-born American singer, member of the Trapp family (The Sound of Music).
- Peter Walker, 91, British Anglican prelate, Bishop of Ely (1977–1989).

=== 29 ===
- Gratien Ananda, 53, Sri Lankan singer, composer, songwriter and lyricist.
- Vladan Batić, 61, Serbian politician and lawyer, Minister of Justice (2001–2003), throat cancer.
- Steve Boros, 74, American baseball player (Tigers) and manager (Athletics, Padres), complications from multiple myeloma.
- Jimmy Coffey, 101, Irish hurler.
- John Doyle, 80, Irish hurler.
- Bill Erwin, 96, American actor (Seinfeld, Falcon Crest, The Twilight Zone).
- Mondine Garcia, 75, French Gypsy jazz guitarist.
- Pavel Kolchin, 80, Russian Olympic gold (1956) and bronze (1956, 1964) medal-winning cross-country skier.
- Ramón Montesinos, 67, Spanish footballer.
- Sören Wibe, 64, Swedish economist and politician, Junilistan party leader, member of the European Parliament and the Riksdag.

=== 30 ===
- Nikolay Abramov, 26, Russian footballer.
- Michael Allinson, 90, British-American actor.
- Paul Calle, 82, American artist, postage stamp designer, melanoma.
- Donald Carroll, 70, American author.
- Sir Ellis Clarke, 93, Trinidadian politician, Governor-General (1972–1976) and President (1976–1987), complications from a stroke.
- V. Balakrishna Eradi, 88, Indian jurist, judge of the Supreme Court of India.
- Bobby Farrell, 61, Aruba-born dancer and entertainer (Boney M.).
- Thomas Funck, 91, Swedish author, composer and director.
- Miranda Guinness, Countess of Iveagh, 71, British aristocrat.
- Roger Milliken, 95, American textile executive (Milliken & Company).
- Tony Proudfoot, 61, Canadian CFL football player, amyotrophic lateral sclerosis.
- Malcolm Spence, 73, South African Olympic bronze medal-winning (1960) athlete.
- Eric Teed, 84, Canadian politician, Mayor of Saint John, New Brunswick (1960–1964).
- Tom Vandergriff, 84, American politician, Mayor of Arlington, Texas (1951–1977) and U.S. Congressman from Texas (1983–1985).
- Gina Wilkinson, 50, Canadian actress (Hangin' In), cervical cancer.
- Jenny Wood-Allen, 99, Scottish athlete and politician, world record holder for the oldest female marathon finisher.
- Betty Yahr, 87, American baseball player.
- Barry Zorthian, 90, American press officer during Vietnam War.

=== 31 ===
- Jesús María Coronado Caro, 92, Colombian Roman Catholic prelate, Bishop of Girardot (1973–1981) and Duitama–Sogamoso (1981–1994).
- Raymond Impanis, 85, Belgian professional cyclist.
- William Harding le Riche, 94, South African-born Canadian epidemiologist.
- Tove Maës, 89, Danish actress.
- Per Oscarsson, 83, Swedish actor, injuries sustained in a fire.
- Shi Tiesheng, 59, Chinese writer, cerebral hemorrhage.
- Syd Ward, 103, New Zealand cricketer.
- John P. Wheeler III, 66, American presidential aide, first chairman of the Vietnam Veterans Memorial Fund. (body found on this date)
