= Joseph Chusak Sirisut =

Thai Roman Catholic prelate (born 1956)

The Most Reverend Joseph Chusak Sirisut
- Bishop of Nakhon Ratchasima
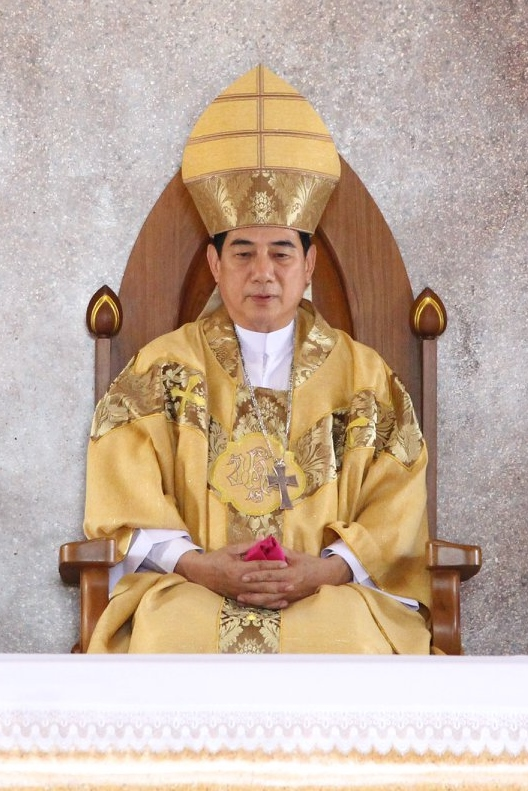
- Native name: ยอแซฟ ชูศักดิ์ สิริสุทธิ์
- Church: Roman Catholic Church
- Diocese: Nakhon Ratchasima
- See: Nakhon Ratchasima
- Appointed: 30 November 2006
- Predecessor: Joachim Phayao Manisap
- Previous post: Secretary General of the Thai Episcopal Conference (2009-18)

Orders
- Ordination: 11 May 1984 by Pope John Paul II
- Consecration: 10 February 2007 by Joachim Phayao Manisap

Personal details
- Born: Joseph Chusak Sirisut; 24 February 1956 (age 70) Bang Nok Kwaek, Ratchaburi, Thailand
- Education: Sukhothai Thammathirat Open University
- Motto: Ad gloriam Dei
- Coat of arms

Joseph Chusak Sirisut (Thai: ยอแซฟ ชูศักดิ์ สิริสุทธิ์, born February 24, 1956) is a Thai Roman Catholic prelate currently serving as the bishop of the Diocese of Nakhon Ratchasima in northeastern Thailand.

== Life ==
Born at Bang Nok Kwaek, the center of the Diocese of Ratchaburi, he studied at the Sampran Major Seminary to become a priest. He received a B.A. in scholastic administration at the Sukhothai Thammathirat Open University and a Masters in Theology in the United States; he was ordained as priest on May 11, 1984.

After ordination he was first headmaster of the Daruna school, and in 1986 he became administrator and director of the Ratchaburi Institute. The following year he was assigned to the Kanchanaburi parish and later to Ratchaburi parish. In 1995 he became assistant priest at St. Girolamo in Samut Songkram, becoming diocesan bursar and chancellor two years later. From 2000-2004 he was a Licentiate in Theology at St. Tomaso in Manila. Returning to Thailand, he was professor at the Sampran major seminary and director of the Centre for Cultural and Religious Research at Sam Phran.

On November 30, 2006, he was appointed as the bishop of Nakhon Ratchasima, and ordained on February 10, 2007, by his predecessor Joachim Phayao Manisap; co-Consecrators were the Apostolic nuncio in Thailand, Archbishop Salvatore Pennacchio, and George Yod Phimphisan, Bishop of Udon Thani.

== Coat of arms ==
The bishopric coat of arms is subdivided into four fields. The star in the upper right quarter symbolizes mother Mary. To the upper left is the holy Bible and a housel below. The pigeon in the lower right holds an olive branch in her beak, the common peace symbol. In the lower left is a Fleur-de-lis, which is the symbol of Saint Joseph, the patron saint of the bishop. His motto written below the shield is "Ad Gloriam Dei" (to the glory of God, 1 Corinthians 10:31).
