= 1920 United States presidential election in Pennsylvania =

- November 2, 1920
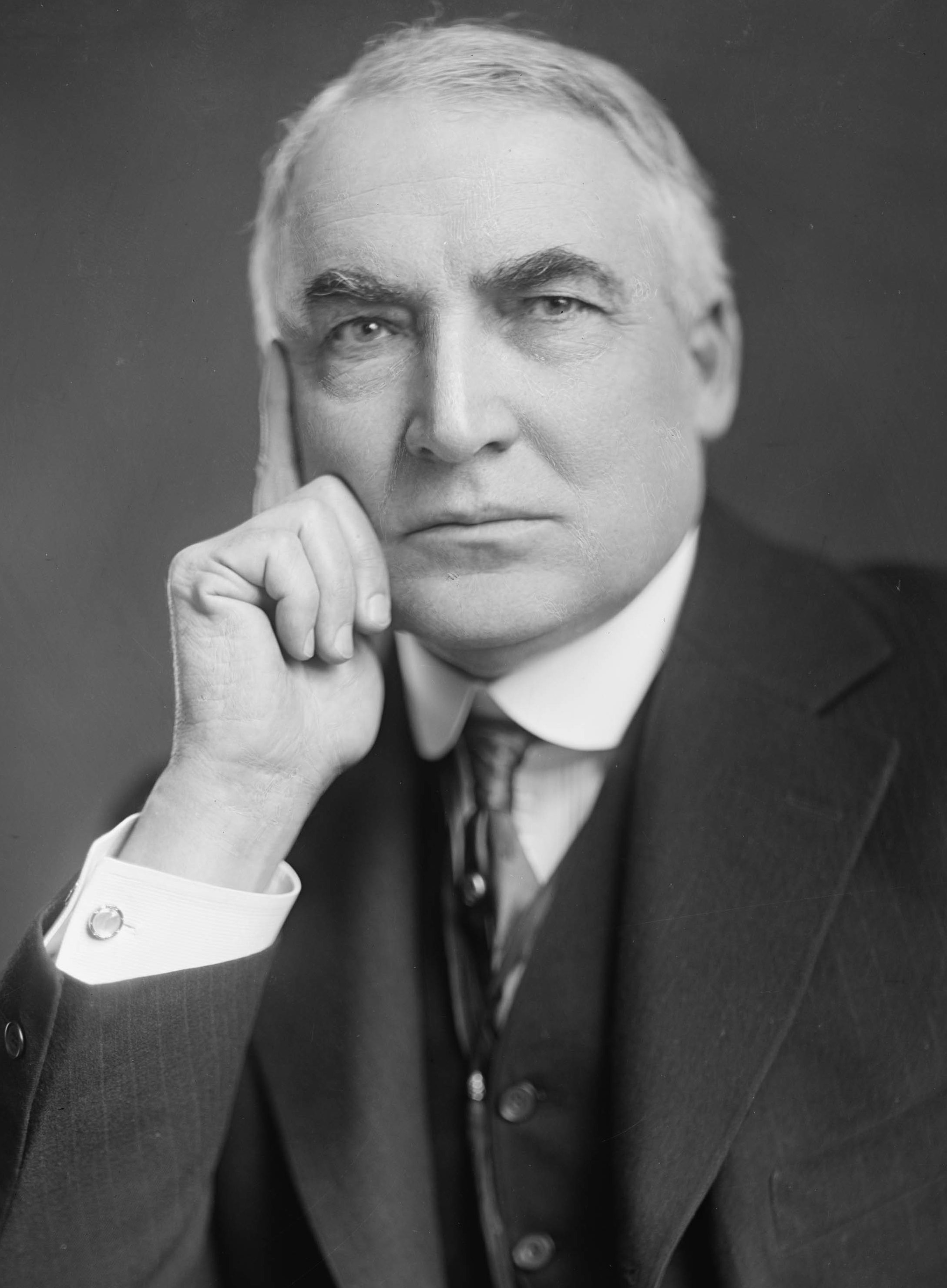

Nominee	Warren G. Harding	James M. Cox
Party	Republican	Democratic
Home state	Ohio	Ohio
Running mate	Calvin Coolidge	Franklin D. Roosevelt
Electoral vote	38	0
Popular vote	1,218,216	503,843
Percentage	65.76%	27.20%
County results
Harding
40–50%
50–60%
60–70%
70–80%
80–90%
Cox
40–50%
50–60%
President before election
Woodrow Wilson
Democratic
Elected President
Warren G. Harding
Republican

The 1920 United States presidential election in Pennsylvania took place on November 2, 1920, as part of the 1920 United States presidential election. Voters chose 38 representatives, or electors to the Electoral College, who voted for president and vice president.

Pennsylvania overwhelmingly voted for the Republican nominee, Senator Warren G. Harding, over the Democratic nominee, Ohio Governor James M. Cox. Harding won Pennsylvania by a landslide margin of 38.56%. This was the first time ever that Berks County and Pike County voted Republican. Fulton County voted Republican for the first time since 1872.

== Results ==
1920 United States presidential election in Pennsylvania
Party	Candidate	Votes	Percentage	Electoral votes
Republican	Warren G. Harding	1,218,216	65.76%	38
Democratic	James M. Cox	503,843	27.20%	0
Socialist	Eugene Debs	70,571	3.81%	0
Prohibition	Aaron Watkins	42,696	2.30%	0
Farmer-Labor	Parley P. Christensen	15,704	0.85%	0
Single Tax	Robert Macauley	806	0.04%	0
Socialist Labor	William Wesley Cox	753	0.04%	0
Write-ins	Write-ins	27	0.00%	0
Totals		1,852,616	100.00%	38

=== Results by county ===
County	Warren G. Harding Republican		James M. Cox Democratic		Eugene V. Debs Socialist		Aaron S. Watkins Prohibition		Parley P. Christensen Farmer-Labor		Various candidates Other parties		Margin		Total votes cast
County	#	%	#	%	#	%	#	%	#	%	#	%	#	%	Total votes cast
Adams	5,323	56.94%	3,852	41.20%	85	0.91%	81	0.87%	6	0.06%	2	0.02%	1,471	15.73%	9,349
Allegheny	138,908	69.21%	40,278	20.07%	16,262	8.10%	3,670	1.83%	1,312	0.65%	286	0.14%	98,630	49.14%	200,716
Armstrong	8,995	69.23%	3,262	25.11%	220	1.69%	427	3.29%	84	0.65%	4	0.03%	5,733	44.13%	12,992
Beaver	11,691	62.90%	4,771	25.67%	1,164	6.26%	816	4.39%	101	0.54%	43	0.23%	6,920	37.23%	18,586
Bedford	5,800	61.67%	2,594	27.58%	80	0.85%	189	2.01%	736	7.83%	6	0.06%	3,206	34.09%	9,405
Berks	22,221	47.69%	18,361	39.41%	5,674	12.18%	288	0.62%	24	0.05%	23	0.05%	3,860	8.28%	46,591
Blair	15,035	56.97%	5,668	21.48%	389	1.47%	582	2.21%	4,671	17.70%	47	0.18%	9,367	35.49%	26,392
Bradford	11,947	75.14%	2,825	17.77%	161	1.01%	943	5.93%	19	0.12%	5	0.03%	9,122	57.37%	15,900
Bucks	14,130	65.17%	6,867	31.67%	405	1.87%	224	1.03%	42	0.19%	13	0.06%	7,263	33.50%	21,681
Butler	10,467	66.87%	3,829	24.46%	214	1.37%	1,103	7.05%	25	0.16%	15	0.10%	6,638	42.41%	15,653
Cambria	19,629	63.91%	6,961	22.67%	834	2.72%	635	2.07%	2,603	8.48%	50	0.16%	12,668	41.25%	30,712
Cameron	1,364	68.06%	497	24.80%	9	0.45%	130	6.49%	3	0.15%	1	0.05%	867	43.26%	2,004
Carbon	7,900	59.19%	5,030	37.69%	281	2.11%	86	0.64%	40	0.30%	9	0.07%	2,870	21.50%	13,346
Centre	7,615	57.82%	4,783	36.31%	84	0.64%	569	4.32%	115	0.87%	5	0.04%	2,832	21.50%	13,171
Chester	18,129	69.57%	7,004	26.88%	277	1.06%	599	2.30%	37	0.14%	14	0.05%	11,125	42.69%	26,060
Clarion	4,615	53.28%	3,487	40.26%	126	1.45%	406	4.69%	22	0.25%	6	0.07%	1,128	13.02%	8,662
Clearfield	9,615	52.28%	5,987	32.55%	657	3.57%	1,163	6.32%	948	5.15%	23	0.13%	3,628	19.72%	18,393
Clinton	4,303	54.58%	2,976	37.75%	259	3.29%	228	2.89%	111	1.41%	7	0.09%	1,327	16.83%	7,884
Columbia	6,238	45.65%	6,965	50.97%	81	0.59%	363	2.66%	14	0.10%	4	0.03%	-727	-5.32%	13,665
Crawford	10,032	62.31%	4,175	25.93%	423	2.63%	1,419	8.81%	33	0.20%	17	0.11%	5,857	36.38%	16,099
Cumberland	8,579	54.73%	6,455	41.18%	92	0.59%	476	3.04%	68	0.43%	4	0.03%	2,124	13.55%	15,674
Dauphin	26,094	65.36%	11,990	30.03%	628	1.57%	776	1.94%	419	1.05%	16	0.04%	14,104	35.33%	39,923
Delaware	34,126	75.34%	9,602	21.20%	697	1.54%	670	1.48%	153	0.34%	45	0.10%	24,524	54.15%	45,293
Elk	5,267	66.14%	2,093	26.28%	178	2.24%	390	4.90%	30	0.38%	6	0.08%	3,174	39.85%	7,964
Erie	19,465	63.68%	6,311	20.65%	1,833	6.00%	2,801	9.16%	87	0.28%	72	0.24%	13,154	43.03%	30,569
Fayette	20,186	56.68%	13,358	37.51%	1,204	3.38%	770	2.16%	81	0.23%	12	0.03%	6,828	19.17%	35,611
Forest	993	56.36%	389	22.08%	58	3.29%	320	18.16%	2	0.11%	0	0.00%	604	34.28%	1,762
Franklin	8,376	60.45%	5,020	36.23%	177	1.28%	246	1.78%	33	0.24%	5	0.04%	3,356	24.22%	13,857
Fulton	1,292	50.19%	1,231	47.82%	11	0.43%	24	0.93%	13	0.51%	3	0.12%	61	2.37%	2,574
Greene	4,253	42.41%	5,592	55.76%	51	0.51%	124	1.24%	2	0.02%	6	0.06%	-1,339	-13.35%	10,028
Huntingdon	5,232	67.74%	1,784	23.10%	64	0.83%	199	2.58%	441	5.71%	4	0.05%	3,448	44.64%	7,724
Indiana	8,616	71.84%	1,936	16.14%	354	2.95%	947	7.90%	131	1.09%	9	0.08%	6,680	55.70%	11,993
Jefferson	7,970	66.69%	3,060	25.61%	386	3.23%	437	3.66%	83	0.69%	14	0.12%	4,910	41.09%	11,950
Juniata	2,112	58.21%	1,443	39.77%	13	0.36%	54	1.49%	6	0.17%	0	0.00%	669	18.44%	3,628
Lackawanna	40,593	60.55%	24,581	36.67%	971	1.45%	746	1.11%	125	0.19%	24	0.04%	16,012	23.88%	67,040
Lancaster	29,549	72.88%	9,521	23.48%	636	1.57%	797	1.97%	29	0.07%	10	0.02%	20,028	49.40%	40,542
Lawrence	9,448	64.38%	2,720	18.53%	854	5.82%	1,586	10.81%	50	0.34%	18	0.12%	6,728	45.84%	14,676
Lebanon	8,778	70.78%	3,016	24.32%	246	1.98%	301	2.43%	55	0.44%	6	0.05%	5,762	46.46%	12,402
Lehigh	18,032	59.49%	10,863	35.84%	829	2.74%	262	0.86%	311	1.03%	13	0.04%	7,169	23.65%	30,310
Luzerne	49,419	65.39%	23,473	31.06%	1,891	2.50%	555	0.73%	190	0.25%	47	0.06%	25,946	34.33%	75,575
Lycoming	10,570	56.72%	5,853	31.41%	695	3.73%	1,470	7.89%	34	0.18%	13	0.07%	4,717	25.31%	18,635
McKean	7,830	68.65%	2,505	21.96%	328	2.88%	699	6.13%	36	0.32%	8	0.07%	5,325	46.69%	11,406
Mercer	11,575	60.29%	4,823	25.12%	1,009	5.26%	1,677	8.73%	102	0.53%	13	0.07%	6,752	35.17%	19,199
Mifflin	3,872	58.93%	2,400	36.52%	156	2.37%	124	1.89%	15	0.23%	4	0.06%	1,472	22.40%	6,571
Monroe	3,278	48.01%	3,396	49.74%	33	0.48%	114	1.67%	3	0.04%	4	0.06%	-118	-1.73%	6,828
Montgomery	31,963	69.70%	12,239	26.69%	1,180	2.57%	303	0.66%	106	0.23%	64	0.14%	19,724	43.01%	45,855
Montour	2,296	53.76%	1,872	43.83%	21	0.49%	77	1.80%	5	0.12%	0	0.00%	424	9.93%	4,271
Northampton	14,227	58.78%	9,086	37.54%	508	2.10%	299	1.24%	71	0.29%	13	0.05%	5,141	21.24%	24,204
Northumberland	17,288	58.44%	9,854	33.31%	1,797	6.07%	590	1.99%	37	0.13%	15	0.05%	7,434	25.13%	29,581
Perry	3,787	60.64%	2,314	37.05%	20	0.32%	86	1.38%	28	0.45%	10	0.16%	1,473	23.59%	6,245
Philadelphia	307,826	73.43%	90,151	21.50%	17,845	4.26%	1,831	0.44%	1,207	0.29%	352	0.08%	217,675	51.92%	419,212
Pike	1,319	58.05%	880	38.73%	36	1.58%	31	1.36%	6	0.26%	0	0.00%	439	19.32%	2,272
Potter	4,036	70.19%	1,106	19.23%	251	4.37%	342	5.95%	12	0.21%	3	0.05%	2,930	50.96%	5,750
Schuylkill	30,259	59.46%	18,746	36.84%	1,313	2.58%	356	0.70%	168	0.33%	45	0.09%	11,513	22.62%	50,887
Snyder	2,751	72.20%	964	25.30%	56	1.47%	34	0.89%	4	0.10%	1	0.03%	1,787	46.90%	3,810
Somerset	12,436	75.81%	2,912	17.75%	490	2.99%	492	3.00%	67	0.41%	7	0.04%	9,524	58.06%	16,404
Sullivan	1,620	57.57%	1,061	37.70%	10	0.36%	122	4.34%	1	0.04%	0	0.00%	559	19.86%	2,814
Susquehanna	6,572	66.41%	2,905	29.36%	80	0.81%	320	3.23%	15	0.15%	4	0.04%	3,667	37.06%	9,896
Tioga	9,718	83.28%	1,258	10.78%	60	0.51%	613	5.25%	11	0.09%	9	0.08%	8,460	72.50%	11,669
Union	3,305	71.38%	1,155	24.95%	38	0.82%	128	2.76%	2	0.04%	2	0.04%	2,150	46.44%	4,630
Venango	7,718	65.71%	2,669	22.72%	283	2.41%	1,032	8.79%	38	0.32%	6	0.05%	5,049	42.98%	11,746
Warren	7,791	65.07%	2,180	18.21%	312	2.61%	1,669	13.94%	10	0.08%	12	0.10%	5,611	46.86%	11,974
Washington	18,514	62.49%	8,827	29.80%	1,157	3.91%	836	2.82%	268	0.90%	23	0.08%	9,687	32.70%	29,625
Wayne	5,164	73.14%	1,589	22.51%	69	0.98%	229	3.24%	6	0.08%	3	0.04%	3,575	50.64%	7,060
Westmoreland	27,077	59.71%	12,845	28.32%	3,338	7.36%	1,866	4.11%	166	0.37%	57	0.13%	14,232	31.38%	45,349
Wyoming	3,208	68.43%	1,247	26.60%	25	0.53%	200	4.27%	4	0.09%	4	0.09%	1,961	41.83%	4,688
York	19,879	55.72%	14,396	40.35%	603	1.69%	754	2.11%	27	0.08%	20	0.06%	5,483	15.37%	35,679
Totals	1,218,216	65.76%	503,843	27.20%	70,571	3.81%	42,696	2.30%	15,704	0.85%	1,586	0.09%	714,373	38.56%	1,852,616

== See also ==
- United States presidential elections in Pennsylvania
