= Nakhon Ratchasima (disambiguation) =

Nakhon Ratchasima is a city in Thailand

Nakhon Ratchasima may also refer to

- Nakhon Ratchasima Province, the province of the city.
- Mueang Nakhon Ratchasima district
- Diocese of Nakhon Ratchasima, the Roman Catholic Diocese
- Nakhon Ratchasima Airport
- Monthon Nakhon Ratchasima, a former monthon (administrative entity) of Thailand
