= Richard Griffith =

Richard Griffith may refer to:

- Sir Richard Griffith, 1st Baronet (1784–1878), Irish geologist and surveyor
- Richard Griffith (general) (1814–1862), United States general
- Richard Griffith (chess player) (1872–1955), English chess player
- Richard Griffith (priest), 17th-century Irish Anglican priest
- Richard Griffith (politician) (1752–1820), Irish politician
- Richard Griffith (physician) (1635?–1691), English physician
- Richard Griffith (Royal Navy officer) (died 1719), British navy captain

== See also ==
- Richard Griffiths (disambiguation)
