= Philip Banchong Chaiyara =

Thai bishop

Philip Banchong Chaiyara C.Ss.R.
- Bishop Emeritus of Ubon Ratchathani
- Native name: ฟิลิป บรรจง ไชยรา
- Church: Catholic Church
- Diocese: Diocese of Ubon Ratchathani
- In office: 25 March 2006 – 2 December 2023
- Predecessor: Michael Bunluen Mansap
- Successor: Stephen Boonlert Phromsena

Orders
- Ordination: 12 June 1975
- Consecration: 27 June 2006 by Michael Bunluen Mansap

Personal details
- Born: 30 January 1945 (age 81) Chang Ming (northwest of Sakon Nakhon), Sakon Nakhon Province, Thailand
- Coat of arms

Philip Banchong Chaiyara C.Ss.R. (born 30 January 1945, Thai ฟิลิป บรรจง ไชยรา) is the bishop of the Roman Catholic diocese of Ubon Ratchathani, Thailand.

Born in Chang Ming (Phanna Nikhom district, Sakon Nakhon Province), he became a member of the Congregation of the Most Holy Redeemer on 2 August 1969. He studied philosophy at the Holy Redeemer College in Waterford, Wisconsin, and theology at Mount St. Alphonsus Seminary at Esopus, New York. On 12 June 1975, he was ordained as priest. 1976-78 he worked as parish priest at the Nongkhai Mission, Diocese of Udon Thani; 1979-81 he was rector of the Redemptorist Seminary Minor at Si Racha; 1981-87 parish priest at the Holy Redeemer Church in Bangkok; 1987-92 parish priest at Bannoi, Khonkaen, Udon Thani diocese; 1993-2002 director of Social Work at Pattaya, Diocese of Chanthaburi. Since 2005 he also was parish priest at St. Nikolaus, Pattaya, Chanthaburi diocese.

On 25 March 2006, he was appointed bishop of the diocese of Ubon Ratchathani.
