= Henri-Albert Thomine =

French Catholic bishop (1896–1945)

The Right Reverend Henri-Albert Thomine MEP
- Vicar Apostolic of Laos
- Installed: 13 July 1944
- Term ended: 21 March 1945
- Predecessor: Ange-Marie Joseph Gouin
- Successor: Claudius Philippe Bayet

Orders
- Ordination: 20 December 1924 as priest
- Consecration: 12 November 1944 by Mgr Lemasle

Personal details
- Born: 11 May 1896 Coutances, Normandy, France
- Died: 21 March 1945, executed by Japanese army (aged 48) Nakai, Laos
- Denomination: Roman Catholic

Henri-Albert Thomine MEP (11 May 1896 – 21 March 1945) was a French Catholic missionary and bishop who served as Vicar Apostolic of Laos from 1944 until 1945 when he was executed by Japanese soldiers in Laos.

== Biography ==
Thomine was born on 11 May 1896 in Coutances, Cherbourg. He received his initial training at the Saint Paul Institute but was then unable to enter the seminary of the Paris Foreign Missions Society due to the outbreak of World War I. During the War he served as second lieutenant in the Artillery, and in 1919 was sent to North Russia as part of the Archangel campaign. On his return to France, he entered the seminary of the Paris Foreign Missions Society, and was ordained a priest on 20 December 1924.

Thomine was sent to Laos on 20 April 1925 to work as a missionary. In December that year he was appointed curate in Tha Rae and then parish priest of Champasak in 1927. In 1940, when the government of Siam began persecuting Christians and burning their churches, Thomine together with other missionaries in the Northeast region were arrested and expelled, and sought refuge in French Indochina.

In 1941, Thomine was sent to Savannakhet and served as military chaplain. After the resignation of bishop Gouin, he was appointed Bishop of Andeda and Apostolic Vicar of Laos. He was consecrated in Thakhek on 12 November 1944 by Mgr Lemasle assisted by Mgr Gouin. At the beginning of 1945, he spent three months in Siam visiting the region of Khorat and his former district of Champasak, before returning to Thakhek.

On 11 March 1945, Thomine, together with Mgr Gouin and Fr Thibaud, were arrested by the Japanese army following their invasion of Laos. After undergoing torture the three men were shot by Japanese soldiers near Nakai on 21 March 1945. Their bodies were found soon after and buried in makeshift graves by French soldiers. In 1946, the bodies were brought back to Thakhek for formal burial at the town's Catholic cemetery.

== See also ==
- Catholic Church in Laos
- Christianity in Laos
