= Duhart =

Duhart is a surname. Notable people with the name include:

- Clarence James Duhart, CSsR (1912–1998), American born bishop in the Catholic Church
- Emilio Duhart (1917–2006), Chilean architect, representative of modern architecture
- Olga Grau Duhart (born 1945), contemporary Chilean writer, professor and philosopher
- Paul Duhart (1920–2006), Canadian-American professional football player
- Pedro Duhart, also known as Pierre (1909–1955), footballer

== See also ==
- Château Duhart-Milon, a winery in the Pauillac appellation of the Bordeaux region of France
- Irene Duhart Long (1950–2020), American physician and an official at NASA
