= Richard Griffiths (disambiguation) =

Richard Griffiths (1947–2013) was an English actor.

Richard Griffiths may also refer to:

- Richard Griffiths (industrialist) (1756–1826), Welsh industrial pioneer
- Richard Griffiths (unionist) (1827–1891), Welsh-born American labor union leader
- Richard Griffiths (historian, born 1935), Welsh historian
- Richard Griffiths (historian, born 1948), English historian
- Rick Griffiths (1948–2010), Australian Aboriginal activist and representative
- Dick Griffiths, Irish footballer

== See also ==
- Richard Griffith (disambiguation)
