= Clarence James Duhart =

American born bishop

Most Reverend Clarence James Duhart, C.Ss.R. D.D.
- Bishop of Udon Thani
- Church: Roman Catholic Church
- See: Diocese of Udon Thani
- Installed: December 18, 1965
- Term ended: October 2, 1975
- Predecessor: None
- Successor: George Yod Phimphisan, C.Ss.R.

Orders
- Ordination: June 29, 1937
- Consecration: April 21, 1966 by Michel Kien Samophithak

Personal details
- Born: March 23, 1912 New Orleans, Louisiana, United States
- Died: September 21, 1998 (aged 86)

Ordination history of Clarence James Duhart
History
Episcopal consecration
- Consecrated by: Michel Kien Samophithak
Episcopal succession
Bishops consecrated by Clarence James Duhart as principal consecrator
- George Yod Phimphisan, C.Ss.R.: December 12, 1975

Clarence James Duhart, CSsR (March 23, 1912 – September 21, 1998) was an American born bishop in the Catholic Church. He served as the first bishop of the Diocese of Undon Thani in the region of Isan, Thailand from 1965–1975.

== Biography ==
Duhart was born in New Orleans, Louisiana. He was educated at the Redemptorist minor seminary, St. Joseph's College, in Kirkwood, Missouri. He attended novitiate in De Soto, Missouri where he professed religious vows as a Redemptorist in the St. Louis Province. He studied for the priesthood at Immaculate Conception Seminary in Oconomowoc, Wisconsin and was ordained there on June 29, 1937.

Father Duhart served as a priest in the United States and as a missionary in the Vice Province of Bangkok until May 7, 1953 when Pope Pius XII named him to be the Apostolic Prefect of the newly established Prefecture Apostolic of Udonthani. He attended the second, third and fourth sessions of the Second Vatican Council from 1963–1964. On December 18, 1965 Pope Paul VI named Duhart the first bishop of the newly established Diocese of Udonthani (the name of the diocese was altered to Udon Thani in 1969). He was consecrated a bishop by Archbishop Michel Kien Samophithak of Thare and Nonseng on April 21, 1966. The principal co-consecrators were Bishops Joseph Khiamsun Nittayo of Bangkok and Claude-Philippe Bayet, M.E.P. of Ubon Ratchathani. He served the Diocese of Udon Thani for ten years before his resignation was accepted by Paul VI on October 2, 1975. He then resumed his work as a Redemptorist missionary in Thailand. He died at the age of 86.
