= Joseph Marie Cuaz =

French Catholic bishop (1862–1950)

The Right Reverend Joseph Marie Cuaz MEP
- Vicar Apostolic of Laos
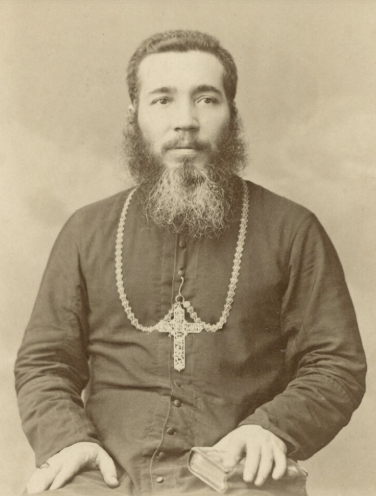
- Installed: 12 May 1899
- Term ended: 26 August 1912
- Predecessor: Office established
- Successor: Constant Jean Baptiste Prodhomme

Orders
- Ordination: 27 September 1885 as priest
- Consecration: 3 September 1899 by Jean-Louis Vey

Personal details
- Born: 8 December 1862 Lyon
- Died: 16 November 1950 (aged 87) Montbeton
- Buried: Montbeton
- Denomination: Roman Catholic

Joseph Marie Cuaz MEP (8 December 1862 – 16 November 1950) was a French Catholic missionary and bishop who served as the first Vicar Apostolic of Laos from 1899 to 1912.

== Biography ==
Cuaz was born on 8 December 1862 in Lyon, France. He received his initial training at the seminary at L'Argentière, entered the seminary of the Société des Missions Etrangères on 17 September 1881, and was ordained a priest on 27 September 1885.

Cuaz was sent to Siam on 8 November 1885 to carry out missionary work. From 1886 to 1899, he was parish priest of Chanthaboon, and built a church there and at Paknam.

On the creation of the Laos mission, carved out of the Siam mission in 1899, Cuaz was appointed the first Vicar Apostolic of Laos and titular Bishop of Hermopolis Parva on 12 May 1899. He was consecrated bishop in Bangkok on 3 September 1899. Cuaz settled in Nong Seng on the banks of the Mekong which became the centre of Lao mission. He built an orphanage, schools, and a convent for native Sisters. He gave instruction to new missionaries, and wrote the first French-Laotian dictionary which was published in 1904.

According to the Catholic Church reporting on the state of the Lao Mission in 1910, there were about 10,000 Catholics in Laos, 33 priests (of whom 29 were European), 53 churches, 35 schools, 22 orphanages, and one seminary.

In 1908, due to a decline in his health, Cuaz returned to France and lived with his sister in Lyon. Constant Jean Baptiste Prodhomme was appointed pro-vicar apostolic and took over the administration of the mission. On 26 August 1912 Cuaz resigned as Vicar Apostolic of Laos and was succeeded by Prodhomme.

In 1933, on the death of his sister Cuaz moved to Montbeton. He died there on 16 November 1950, aged 87, and was buried at the Mountbeton sanotorium cemetery.

== See also ==
- Catholic Church in Laos
- Christianity in Laos
