= Joseph Luechai Thatwisai =

- Bishop of Udon Thani
- Native name: ยอแซฟ ลือชัย ธาตุวิสัย
- Church: Catholic Church
- Diocese: Diocese of Udon Thani
- Appointed: 14 November 2009
- Predecessor: George Yod Phimphisan

Orders
- Ordination: 24 May 1990
- Consecration: 6 February 2010 by George Yod Phimphisan

Personal details
- Born: 2 December 1962 (age 63) Phon Sung (in present-day Ban Dung district), Udon Thani province, Thailand
- Coat of arms

Joseph Luechai Thatwisai (born December 2, 1962, Thai: ลือชัย ธาตุวิสัย; RTGS: Lue-chai Thatwisai) is appointed Roman Catholic Bishop of Udon Thani diocese.

Joseph Luechai Thatwisai was ordained a priest in 1990. He obtains a pontifical degree in Scripture and was professor of biblical theology at Thailand's Saeng Tham National Major Seminary from 2000 to 2006. Afterwards he earned a PhD in biblical studies at the Catholic Institute of Paris. Since 2008 he was secretary of the Thai bishops’ Catholic Commission for the Bible commission.

Pope Benedict XVI made the episcopal appointment on November 14, 2009. He was ordained a bishop by his predecessor, Bishop George Yod Phimphisan, C.Ss.R., on February 6, 2010.
