= Diocese of Nakhon Ratchasima =

Latin Catholic diocese in Thailand

Diocese of Nakhon Rathasima Dioecesis Nakhonratchasimaensis สังฆมณฑลนครราชสีมา

Location
- Country: Thailand
- Ecclesiastical province: Thare and Nonseng
- Metropolitan: Thare and Nonseng

Statistics
- Area: 41,148 km^{2} (15,887 sq mi)
- Population: Total; Catholics: (as of 2023); 5,200,000; 5,721 (0.11%)

Information
- Denomination: Catholic
- Sui iuris church: Latin Church
- Rite: Roman Rite
- Cathedral: Our Lady of Lourdes Cathedral in Nakhon Ratchasima

Current leadership
- Pope: Leo XIV
- Bishop: Joseph Chusak Sirisut
- Metropolitan Archbishop: Anthony Weradet Chaiseri

Map
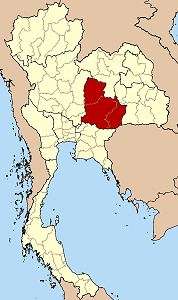

The Diocese of Nakhon Ratchasima (Dioecesis Nakhonratchasimaensis, Thai: สังฆมณฑลนครราชสีมา) is a Latin Catholic ecclesiastical jurisdiction located in the north-east of Thailand. It is a suffragan diocese of the Archdiocese of Thare and Nonseng.

The diocese covers an area of 41,148 km^{2}, covering 3 provinces of Thailand - Buriram, Chaiyaphum and Nakhon Ratchasima; as of 2023, of the 5.2 million citizens of the three provinces, 5,721 were members of the Catholic Church. It is divided into 28 parishes, having 27 priests altogether.

== History ==
The diocese was created on March 22, 1965, when the Vicariate Apostolic of Ubon was split. December 18, 1965 the Vicariate Apostolic of Nakhorn-Rajasima was elevated to a diocese.

== Cathedral ==
The cathedral of the diocese is the Our Lady of Lourdes Cathedral (อาสนวิหารแม่พระประจักษ์ที่เมืองลูร์ด), located in the town Nakhon Ratchasima.14°58′24″N 102°4′42″E

The cathedral can hold over 3,000 people.

== Bishops ==
- Joseph Chusak Sirisut: appointed November 30, 2006
- Joachim Phayao Manisap: May 30, 1977 - November 30, 2006 (resigned)
- Alain Sauveur Ferdinand van Gaver, M.E.P: March 22, 1965 - May 30, 1977 (resigned)
