= AmeriCares =

Global nonprofit organization focused on health and development

Coordinates: 41.0651°N 73.5194°W

Americares
- Founded: 1979
- Founder: Robert Macauley
- Type: Non-governmental organization
- Location: Stamford, Connecticut, USA
- Region served: 164 countries
- Product: Humanitarian relief, including medicines, medical supplies, nutritional supplements
- Website: Americares.org

AmeriCares is a global non-profit organization focused on health and development that responds to individuals affected by poverty, disaster, or crisis. The organization addresses poverty, disasters, or crises with medicine, medical supplies and health programs.

Since its establishment in 1979, AmeriCares has delivered more than $17 billion in humanitarian aid to 164 countries to address issues like natural disasters, the restoration of a community after natural disasters, and ongoing health crises and inequality.

AmeriCares has its global headquarters in Stamford, Connecticut. Additionally, the organization has offices in Colombia, El Salvador, Haiti, India, Liberia, Nepal, the Philippines, Tanzania, Puerto Rico, and elsewhere in the United States. AmeriCares operates three warehouses, one each in the U.S., Europe, and India.

== History ==
Robert Macauley founded Americares in New Canaan, Connecticut in 1979. It was then relocated to its current location in Stamford, Connecticut.

In 1981, Pope John Paul II asked Macauley to raise funds that would provide medicine, clothing and other supplies for people suffering under martial law in Poland. In March 1982, the first airlift delivered $2.4 million worth of medicine and supplies to Poland. This marked the first official mission of the organization.

In 1993, AmeriCares was rated "the Best Charity in America" by Money.

== Leadership ==
Macauley was the CEO of AmeriCares from 1979 to 2002 and chairman of the board until his death caused by emphysema in 2010.

Michael J. Nyenhuis was CEO from 2014 until March 2020, when he was succeeded by Christine Squires.

AmeriCares announced in 2020 that former executive vice president and chief development officer Christine Squires has superseded Nyenhuis as CEO of the AmeriCares Foundation.

Jerry Leamon is chairman of AmeriCares Foundation. Leamon joined the board in 2005 and was elected chairman in 2015. He retired from the Deloitte network in 2012 as global managing director responsible for client and market-facing programs.

== Emergency response ==
AmeriCares organizes emergency response teams to deliver urgently needed aid to survivors of disasters. Such aid includes medicines, medical supplies, water or water purification treatments, and other critically needed resources. In 2012, AmeriCares responded to 24 emergencies in 18 countries.

Following Hurricane Sandy in 2012, AmeriCares delivered emergency supplies for more than 400,000 people in Connecticut, New Jersey, and New York, including blankets, flashlights, bottled water, and first aid kits. AmeriCares continued to provide post-emergency relief with the AmeriCares mobile medical clinic used to assist health care facilities unable to treat patients because of storm damage and power outages.

AmeriCares sent $6 million in medical aid immediately after the 2010 Haiti earthquake. Among prominent donors, actress Jennifer Aniston supported the organization's work in Haiti with a benefit screening. Since then, the organization has given the country more than $60 million in aid for vaccinations, maternal health, cholera prevention and health workers training.

In response to the earthquake and tsunami in Japan in 2011, AmeriCares sent close to $6 million in medical supplies and humanitarian aid. The recovery work in Japan included restoring medical and dental clinics and psychosocial programs for survivors. Since then most of these programs have found to be successful. The medical and dental clinics are all back and in good standing form. On top of that many survivors did reach out for psychological assistance and have been treated.

In 2020 there was a quick and needed response from AmeriCares due to the coronavirus. The COVID-19 pandemic is a pandemic of coronavirus disease 2019 (COVID-19) caused by the severe acute respiratory syndrome coronavirus 2 (SARS-CoV-2). The disease was first identified in Wuhan, Hubei, China in December 2019. AmeriCares has a long history of responding to infectious disease outbreaks, including cholera, ebola, dengue, and Zika outbreaks. AmeriCares is delivering more than 1.4 million protective masks for health workers on the front lines of the COVID-19 pandemic in the United States. The masks will help to alleviate shortages at hospitals and primary care facilities in 11 states and Puerto Rico. This ongoing effort, along with monetary funds, is being contributed in relief of this pandemic.

Other major disasters that AmeriCares has responded to include:

- 1988 Armenian earthquake
- 2004 Indian Ocean earthquake and tsunami
- Myanmar's Cyclone Nargis (2008)
- China earthquake (2008)
- 2010 Haiti earthquake (2010)
- Japan earthquake and tsunami (2011)
- Joplin tornado (2011)
- Somalia famine (2011)
- Hurricane Matthew (2016)
- Hurricane Harvey (2017)
- Hurricane Irma (2017)
- Hurricane Dorian (2019)
- COVID-19 pandemic
- Russo-Ukrainian War

== Budget, contributions, fundraising approaches, donations ==
According to Americare's 2017 IRS 990 information provided by ProPublica, the AmeriCares Foundation was reported to have reached a total revenue of 2.79 billion dollars in contributions for the fiscal year-end of 2017. In the 2017 report, AmeriCares’ total functional expenses were reported at 1.92 billion dollars; with the majority of it being charitable services. For that year, professional fundraising fees were recorded at 1.13 million dollars.

According to 2019 data collected by Forbes, AmeriCares was number 10 on the list of the top 100 largest charities in the United States. In that same 2019 report, Forbes also recorded that AmeriCares reached a total revenue of 1 billion dollars in private donations; with a 127% donor dependency rate. For that year also, AmeriCares was reported to earn $318 million in net assets. Forbes rated AmeriCares a score of 99% in charitable commitment for the year 2019; with AmeriCares reported to have spent 1.3 billion dollars on charitable services expenses, 5 million dollars on management and general expenses and 11 million dollars in fundraising. The highest amount of compensation to an individual employee for 2021 was $506,885.

== Global medical assistance ==
=== Assistance and aid ===
Globally, AmeriCares delivers free medical aid including prescription and over-the-counter medicines, nutritional supplements, surgical and wound care supplies, hospital supplies and diagnostics and laboratory equipment with the support of corporate and financial donors.

The nonprofit sends aid to institutions through partner organizations located in the United States and countries around the world. The institutions include thousands of general and specialty hospitals, outpatient clinics, community health programs, hospice residences, rehabilitation centers and homes for children and the elderly.

AmeriCares also works to create or improve existing health care programs that target specific health issues, including maternal health, child health, malnutrition, cholera and chronic diseases.

=== AmeriCares in the United States ===
AmeriCares supplies medicine and medical supplies to more than 400 free and charitable health care clinics across the U.S. AmeriCares provides emergency relief as well as vaccinations to low income Americans. The nonprofit also responds to disasters (hurricanes, tornadoes, floods, wildfires, etc.) in the U.S. by sending medicine and emergency relief supplies including bottled water, hygiene kits and household cleaning kits.

=== Medical Outreach Program ===
AmeriCares Medical Outreach Program donates medical supplies to U.S.-based healthcare professionals who provide medical care to disadvantaged or isolated areas around the world. The services offered by these field volunteers range from primary care to specialty surgeries. Each year, AmeriCares supports over 1,000 medical outreach trips in approximately 80 countries, with primary medications, anesthesia, surgical supplies, nutritional supplements, and over-the-counter products. Volunteer teams treat over 700,000 primary care patients and perform approximately 40,000 surgeries annually.

=== AmeriCares India ===
In 2006, AmeriCares India Foundation was registered as a public charitable trust in India. Prof. (Dr.) Purvish M. Parikh, a distinguished oncologist, was named the new managing director of AmeriCares India. This new division gave AmeriCares a new platform to deliver more medicines and emergency supplies to facilities serving the poor in India. The AmeriCares India mobile medical clinics provide medical consultations and medicines to those living in the Mumbai slums. The organization also raises awareness about disease prevention, supports health promotion programs, and educates children on the importance of proper hygiene techniques.

== AmeriCares free clinics ==
AmeriCares' free clinics have provided primary health care to the uninsured since 1994. The free clinics provide medical services to thousands of people every year by utilizing a network of volunteer doctors, nurses, interpreters and administrative personnel. AmeriCares personnel also work closely with local hospitals, labs and specialists who donate their services.

The four AmeriCares free clinics are:

- Bob Macauley AmeriCares Free Clinic of Norwalk (established 1994)
- Boehringer Ingelheim AmeriCares Free Clinic of Danbury (established 1997)
- Weisman AmeriCares Free Clinic of Bridgeport (established 2003)
- Stamford AmeriCares Free Clinic (established 2014)

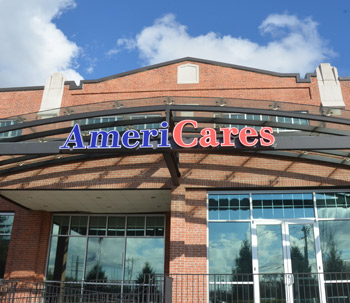
Headquarters in Stamford, Connecticut

== Airlift Benefit ==
AmeriCares has hosted an annual Airlift Benefit, also known as the Hangar Party, since 1988. The event takes place at the Westchester County Airport in White Plains, New York. At the end of the evening, donors board a chartered plane to see AmeriCares work firsthand. Destinations have included the Dominican Republic, El Salvador, Guatemala, Haiti, Honduras, Mexico and Nicaragua.

In recent years, the Airlift Benefit has had prominent hosts: Tony Goldwyn in 2020, Craig Melvin in 2022, Bryan Cranston in 2024, and Ross Mathews in 2025. The Airlift Benefit has also drawn special guests including actor Aaron Eckhart and baseball manager Bobby Valentine.

== Criticism ==
AmeriCares has been criticized for being connected to the CIA or being a front of the U.S. government in the past. In particular, a Washington Post article reported that in the 1980s it funneled aid to counter-insurgency efforts in Guatemala through its armed forces, and sent aid meant for Honduras to Miskito people affiliated with the Contras in Nicaragua. AmeriCares denied that they intentionally sent aid for armed groups, but acknowledged that they would send weapons if the president of the United States asked them to.

In 2003, an article in the South African newspaper of record Mail & Guardian reported strong connections between the organization's leadership and president George W. Bush, with his mother, Barbara Bush, serving as the charity's "ambassador-at-large" and his brother, Prescott Bush, along with United States Secretary of State Colin Powell on the board. The organization also branded itself as "the humanitarian arm of corporate America", sending goods of questionable humanitarian character, such as Mars, Inc. chocolate and Pop-Tarts, because it provides tax benefits while relieving corporations of warehousing expenses.
