= George Yod Phimphisan =

Bishop of the Catholic Church in Thailand (1933-2017)

The Most Reverend George Yod Phimphisan, C.Ss.R., D.D.
- Bishop of Udon Thani
- Church: Roman Catholic Church
- Diocese: Udon Thani
- See: Diocese of Udon Thani
- Installed: October 2, 1975
- Term ended: November 14, 2009
- Predecessor: Clarence James Duhart, C.Ss.R.
- Successor: Joseph Luechai Thatwisai

Orders
- Ordination: June 24, 1958
- Consecration: December 12, 1975 by Clarence James Duhart, C.Ss.R.

Personal details
- Born: January 19, 1933 Bangkok, Thailand
- Died: December 15, 2017 (aged 84) Udon Thani, Thailand

Ordination history of George Yod Phimphisan
History
Episcopal consecration
- Consecrated by: Clarence James Duhart, C.Ss.R.
Episcopal succession
Bishops consecrated by George Yod Phimphisan as principal consecrator
- Joseph Luechai Thatwisai: February 6, 2010

George Yod Phimphisan (Thai: ยอด พิมพิสาร; RTGS: Yot Phimphisan; January 19, 1933 – December 19, 2017) was a 20th- and 21st-century bishop of the Catholic Church in Thailand. He served as the second bishop of the Diocese of Udon Thani in the region of Isan, Thailand from 1975 to 2009.

== Biography ==
Phimphisan was born in Bangkok. He professed religious vows as a Redemptorist and studied for the priesthood at Immaculate Conception Seminary in Oconomowoc, Wisconsin, USA. He was ordained a priest on June 24, 1958.

Father Phimphisan served as a priest in the Vice Province of Bangkok until October 2, 1975, when Pope Paul VI named him to be the second bishop of the Diocese of Udon Thani. He was ordained a bishop by his predecessor, Bishop Clarence James Duhart, C.Ss.R., at the Cathedral of Our Mother of Perpetual Help on December 12, 1975. The principal co-consecrators were Archbishop Michel Kien Samophithak of Thare and Nonseng and Giovanni Morettiet the Apostolic Pro-Nuncio to Thailand, and the Apostolic Delegate to Laos, Malaysia and Singapore.

Bishop Phimphisan served as the Apostolic Administrator of the Archdiocese of Thare and Nonseng from May 14, 2004, to July 1, 2005. He was the president of the Bishops’ Conference of Thailand for three terms: 1991–1994, 1997–2000 and 2006–2009. He served the Diocese of Udon Thani for 34 years as its bishop before his resignation was accepted by Pope Benedict XVI on November 14, 2009.

The Bishop died on December 15, 2017, around 14:10 at Aek Udon Hospital.
