= Ange-Marie Joseph Gouin =

French Catholic bishop (1877–1945)

The Right Reverend Ange-Marie Joseph Gouin MEP
- Vicar Apostolic of Laos
- Installed: 17 April 1922
- Term ended: 1 July 1943
- Predecessor: Constant Jean Baptiste Prodhomme
- Successor: Henri-Albert Thomine

Orders
- Ordination: 22 June 1902 as priest
- Consecration: 1 October 1922 by René Perros

Personal details
- Born: 7 December 1877 Maxent, Brittany, France
- Died: 21 March 1945, executed by Japanese army (aged 67) Nakay
- Denomination: Roman Catholic

Ange-Marie Joseph Gouin MEP (7 December 1877 – 21 March 1945) was a French Catholic missionary and bishop who served as the Vicar Apostolic of Laos from 1922 to 1943.

== Biography ==
Gouin was born on 7 December 1877 in Maxent, Brittany. He received his initial training at the Seminary of Saint Méen, then entered the seminary of the Paris Foreign missions Society, and was ordained a priest on 22 June 1902.

Gouin was sent to Laos on 23 July 1902 to work as a missionary and went to Siengvang to assist Fr Guégo. After three years there carrying out missionary work and studying the language, he was appointed assistant to the priest in Thare in 1906 and served in various capacities. In 1922, he became the parish priest of Keng Sadok situated south of Pakxan on the Mekong.

On 27 April 1922, he was appointed titular bishop of Orcistus, and Vicar Apostolic of Laos succeeding Bishop Prodhomme who died in 1920, and was consecrated on 1 October 1922 in Nong Seng, Laos by Bishop Perros. Under his management, the number of Christians served by the Laos mission grew from 10,000 to 22,000, and there was an increase in the number of Laotian priests. In 1933, following the revolt in Siam, Gouin received the thanks of the government for his assistance in restoring peace to the country.

From 1939 and the outbreak of World War II, Gouin faced serious difficulties due to the hostility of the government of Thailand which sought to regain territory in French Indochina—including Cambodia and Laos—that it had lost to France in the 1893 Franco-Siamese crisis. Gouin was imprisoned, the cathedral, seminary, and all the mission buildings were destroyed, churches were burned and many Christians were killed. From 1940, he struggled to maintain the mission from Thakhek on the east bank of the Mekong in territory controlled by the French. After three years, due to declining health, he resigned his office and on 29 July 1944 Henri-Albert Thomine was appointed as the new Apostolic Vicar of Laos, and consecrated bishop in November 1944 attended by Gouin who remained to assist his successor.

On 9 March 1945, the Japanese invaded Laos, overthrew the French administration, and imprisoned many French citizens in concentration camps. Gouin and Thomine were arrested together with several French officials. On 21 March 1945, they were taken to Nakay, about 80 kilometres from Thakhek, where they were shot. Later the bodies were recovered and brought back to Thakhek where a funeral took place in May 1946.

== See also ==
- Catholic Church in Laos
- Christianity in Laos
