= Constant Jean Baptiste Prodhomme =

French Catholic bishop (1849–1920)

The Right Reverend Constant Jean Baptiste Prodhomme MEP
- Vicar Apostolic of Laos
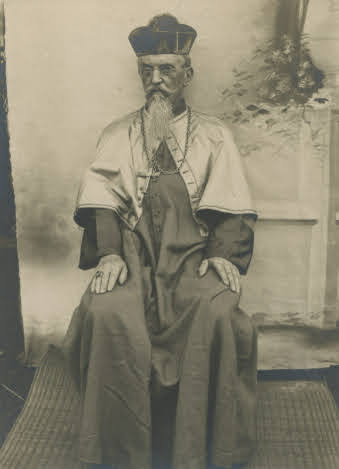
- Installed: 2 June 1913
- Term ended: 20 August 1920
- Predecessor: Joseph Marie Cuaz
- Successor: Ange-Marie Joseph Gouin

Orders
- Ordination: 30 May 1874 as priest
- Consecration: 14 September 1913 by Victor Charles Quinton

Personal details
- Born: 23 January 1849 Gorron, France
- Died: 20 August 1920 (aged 71) Nong Seng, Laos
- Denomination: Roman Catholic

Constant Jean Baptiste Prodhomme MEP (23 January 1849 – 20 August 1920) was a French Catholic missionary and bishop who served as Vicar Apostolic of Laos from 1913 to 1920.

== Biography ==
Prodhomme was born on 23 January 1849 in Gorron, France, the eldest of 13 children. He entered the seminary of the Société des Missions Etrangères on 7 September 1871 and was ordained a priest on 30 May 1874.

Prodhomme was sent to Siam as a missionary in 1874. After his initial residence in Bangkok under the tutelage of Bishop Vey, he was sent to the town of Ayutthaya to assist the priest in charge of the church there. While the mission in Ayutthaya was seeking ways to expand its missionary work into northern areas, Prodhomme made several journeys northwards, visited Saraburi, and became acquainted with the language and customs of the Lao people. He settled in Ubon Ratchathani in 1881 in a small house provided by the district chief and began his missionary work in earnest. In 1884, he made a journey north along the Mekong to Vientiane.

Prodhomme, together with fellow missionary Fr François Guégo, is credited with the founding of the Catholic Lao mission which extended across the whole of Isan and modern-day Laos. Formally established on 4 May 1889, the Vicariate Apostolic of Laos was created out of the diocese of Siam, and administered from that date by its first Vicar Apostolic of Laos and titular bishop, Joseph Marie Cuaz.

Around 1908, Bishop Cuaz's health began to fail and Prodhomme was appointed pro-vicar apostolic and took over the administration of the vicariate. In 1913, Bishop Cuaz resigned and on 2 June 1913 Prodhomme succeeded him as Vicar Apostolic of Laos, he was appointed titular Bishop of Geras and consecrated on 14 September 1913 in Saigon.

Prodhomme died on 20 August 1920 in Nong Seng, Laos, aged 71.
