= Lawrence Khai Saen-Phon-On =

Thai archbishop (1928–2007)

Lawrence Khai Saen-Phon-On (Thai: ลอเรนซ์ คายน์ แสนพลอ่อน, August 17, 1928 – July 24, 2007) was archbishop of Thare and Nonseng in northeast Thailand from 1980 till his retirement in 2004.

Born in Ban Thung-Mon, Mueang Sakon Nakhon district, he became very sick as a young child and his Catholic mother begged God that he might live and promised to offer him to the holy priesthood should he survive. As a 12-15 year-old Catholic student in public (national) school, and a natural leader in his faith, Lawrence was targeted for torture by the Buddhist nationalist police officers of the government that had closed down his Catholic school. Among the torture he endured on the grounds of school the school principal took him from the classroom, locked him in his office and repeatedly bashed Lawrence's head against the wall in an effort to get him to reject his faith. At another time police officers showed up at school, placed a loaded gun in his mouth, and threatened to shoot if he did not renounce Jesus. At another time police lined up all the Catholic students and told them to cross a demarcated line if they believed in Jesus. Only Lawrence did, and for that he was suspended upside down in a well by his ankles. At another time they forced him to stare at the sun. Nearby, in 1940, seven young men and women, including nuns and children, were martyred for their faith.

Lawrence became a priest in Thare on January 16, 1957. Years later, the principal of the school who had persecuted Lawrence, asked for forgiveness, and he was inspired by Lawrence's witness of faith to convert to the Catholic faith.

Lawrence met the youngest of the would be seven martyrs, who had been a girl of 13. She marched to the place of martyrdom with the nuns and others but God miraculously spared her and she told, in detail, the story of the martyrdom to Archbishop Khai, who became the Postulator to promote the Cause for their sainthood.

Background for persecution of Lawrence Khai and Other Catholics:

Beginning in 1940, there was religious persecution in Thailand. In the village of Songkhon, seven Catholics were martyred. Before the Japanese invasion of Thailand there was a reaction against things Western and foreign including Christianity. This led to the martyrdom of seven Catholics in the village of Songkhon in north-east Thailand who were beatified by Pope John Paul II in 1989.

The first missionaries to Thailand were Portuguese Dominicans who arrived in "Siam" in 1554, as it was then known. Siam was a Buddhist kingdom which welcomed Christians for their knowledge. By the 19th century most Catholic missionaries from Europe were from the Paris Foreign Missions Society (Société des Missions Étrangères de Paris – MEP), living in enclaves and exempt from national jurisdiction and taxation. During the 1930s there was a growing sense of anxiety and crisis as Japan invaded China and threatened Southeast Asia. The country's name was changed to Thailand in 1939. The government adopted a nationalistic and anti-western stance, and Christianity was branded “the foreign religion." Churches and schools were requisitioned, and Thai Christians were put under pressure. The Vichy Government, established after the fall of France in 1940, allowed the Japanese to set up bases in northern Vietnam, and the Thai government responded by invading French Indo-China (present-day Laos and Cambodia). Japan invaded Thailand in 1941 to secure bases to advance into Malaya and Singapore, and the Thai government signed an alliance that lasted until the Japanese were defeated in 1945.

In this tense atmosphere preceding the Japanese invasion the usually tolerant Thais found “the foreign religion” an easy scapegoat, although Catholicism had been in Thailand for over three hundred and fifty years.

Investigation and beatification

After a canonical investigation into the case of these seven Servants of God, reports for consideration of their beatification and canonisation as martyrs of the Church were sent to the Sacred Congregation for the Causes of Saints in Rome. In a great ceremony in 1986 in the Church of the Holy Redeemer in the village of Songkhon the remains of all seven were re-interred. Pope John Paul II beatified them in Rome on Mission Sunday, 22 October 1989.

Fr Lawrence Khai was appointed Archbishop of Thare and Nonseng on March 6, 1980, and consecrated on July 16, 1980, by his predecessor Michel Kien Samophithak. As archbishop, he was prominently involved in expanding the archdiocese, especially by developing education and building churches. He also often held seminars to determine a model scheme for archdiocesan vision and mission. On May 14, 2004, his resignation was accepted. He died of the effects of diabetes on July 24, 2007, and was buried on July 28.
