= Our Lady of Lourdes Cathedral, Nakhon Ratchasima =

Our Lady of Lourdes Cathedral
- อาสนวิหารแม่พระประจักษ์ที่เมืองลูร์ด
- Our Lady of Lourdes Cathedral
- 14°58′24″N 102°4′42″E
- Location: Nakhon Ratchasima
- Country: Thailand
- Denomination: Roman Catholic Church

The Our Lady of Lourdes Cathedral, (Thai: อาสนวิหารแม่พระประจักษ์ที่เมืองลูร์ด) also called Nakhon Ratchasima Cathedral, is a religious building affiliated with the Catholic Church which is located in the city of Nakhon Ratchasima, in the province of the same name in the Asian country of Thailand.

== History ==
The church was the seat of the apostolic vicariate of Nakhorn-Rajasima until it was elevated to the status of diocese by the papal bull "Qui in fastigio" of 1965 of Pope Paul VI. Now is the main church of the Diocese of Nakhon Ratchasima (Dioecesis Nakhonratchasimaensis, สังฆมณฑลนครราชสีมา). The church is dedicated to the Virgin Mary who according to Catholic doctrine is the Mother of Jesus, specifically chose the title of Our Lady of Lourdes a name of French origin.

== See also ==
- Roman Catholicism in Thailand
