= Diocese of Udon Thani =

Latin Catholic diocese in Thailand

Diocese of Udon Thani Dioecesis Udonthaniensis สังฆมณฑลอุดรธานี

Location
- Country: Thailand
- Metropolitan: Archdiocese of Thare and Nonseng

Statistics
- Area: 50,046 km^{2} (19,323 sq mi)
- Population: Total; Catholics: (as of 2010); 5,371,000; 16,822 (0.3%)

Information
- Denomination: Catholic
- Sui iuris church: Latin Church
- Rite: Roman Rite
- Cathedral: Cathedral of Our Mother of Perpetual Help

Current leadership
- Pope: Leo XIV
- Bishop: Joseph Luechai Thatwisai
- Metropolitan Archbishop: Anthony Weradet Chaiseri

Map
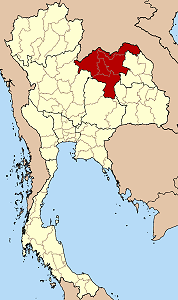
- Location of the Diocese of Udon Thani

The Diocese of Udon Thani (Dioecesis Udonthaniensis, Thai: สังฆมณฑลอุดรธานี) is a Latin Catholic ecclesiastical jurisdiction in northeast Thailand. It is a suffragan diocese of the archdiocese of Thare and Nonseng.

The diocese covers an area of 50,046 km², covering five provinces of Thailand: Khon Kaen, Loei, Nongbua Lamphu, Nong Khai, and Udon Thani. As of 2001, of the 5.3 million citizens, 5,612 are members of the Catholic Church. It is divided into 56 parishes, having 31 priests altogether.

== History ==
The Prefecture Apostolic of Udonthani was created on May 7, 1953, when the Vicariate Apostolic of Thare was split. On December 18, 1965 the Prefecture Apostolic was elevated to a diocese.

== Cathedral ==
The Cathedral of Our Mother of Perpetual Help (Thai: อาสนวิหารพระมารดานิจจานุเคราะห์) is located in Udon Thani town.

== Bishops ==
The bishops have included:

- Joseph Luechai Thatwisai, appointed November 14, 2009
- George Yod Phimphisan, C.Ss.R.: October 2, 1975 - November 14, 2009 (resigned)
- Clarence James Duhart, C.Ss.R.: 1953 - October 2, 1975 (resigned)
