= Elmo Gideon =

American painter and sculptor

Gideon
- Born: Elmo Clifford Gideon; January 11, 1924; Overland Park, Kansas
- Died: December 21, 2010; Thomasville, Georgia, U.S.
- Known for: Painting, sculpture

Elmo Clifford Gideon (January 11, 1924 – December 21, 2010) was an American painter and sculptor of the 20th and 21st centuries.

Thursday, 12 April 2001, was declared “Gideon Day” with an official Proclamation by the Miami-Dade County Office of the Mayor and Board of County Commissioners.
