= Mondine Garcia =

- Born: 1936
- Died: 29 December 2010 (aged 73–74)
- Genres: Gypsy jazz
- Instrument: Guitar

Mondine Garcia (1936 – 29 December 2010) was a French guitarist from Paris who specialized in gypsy jazz.

== Career ==
The father of guitarist Ninine Garcia, Mondine Garcia had a long, highly respected career in France as a notable part of the second generation of gypsy guitarists after Django Reinhardt. He often performed at the same venues and festivals alongside such contemporaries as Moreno Winterstein, Dorado Schmitt and Marcel Campion, and is succeeded by such "third generation" players as Angelo Debarre. His regular venue was La Chope des puces at Porte de Clignancourt on rue Des Rosiers, Saint-Ouen. One of his last festival appearances was at the Festival Jazz Muzette.

Garcia played for decades on a Favino guitar, fitted with a Stimer S.51 held on by packing tape, the string action "adjusted" by a folded wad of paper beneath the bridge.

== Discography ==
- Les Enfants de Django – (1993)
- Les Manouches de Saint Ouen – avec Ninine Garcia (2007)

== Film appearances ==
- Les enfants de Django (1993)
