= Ros Mey =

Venerable Ros Mey

Personal life
- Born: June 30, 1925 Kandal, Cambodia, French Indochina
- Died: December 12, 2010 (aged 85) Providence, Rhode Island
- Spouse: Saythun Mey (deceased)
- Children: 7
- Occupation: monk; president, Chov Atika Wat Thormikaram temple

Religious life
- Religion: Buddhism

Senior posting
- Predecessor: Samdech Maha Ghosananda

Ros Mey (June 30, 1925 – December 12, 2010) was a Cambodian-born American Buddhist monk and survivor of the Khmer Rouge regime. After escaping Cambodia in 1979 with his surviving family to a refugee camp in Thailand, Mey moved to the United States in 1982. In 1998, Mey became the Chov Atika, or head monk, of Wat Thormikaram, the first ethnic Khmer Buddhist temple in the United States, which is located in Providence, Rhode Island.

== Early life in Cambodia ==
Mey was born in Svay Rolom, Kandal in Cambodia on June 30, 1925. He was the fifth child born to Ouch Mey (his father) and Soeum Mon (his mother), having four older sisters and a younger brother.

In 1945, he married Saythun Mey and sired seven children, three boys and four girls.

Mey originally worked as a land surveyor for the Cambodian government until the Khmer Rouge took power in 1975, establishing Democratic Kampuchea.

== Escape from Cambodia ==
An estimated three million people would be killed by the Khmer Rouge, including four of Mey's children – three daughters and one son. Mey and his surviving family managed to escape the country in 1979 and fled to the Khao-I-Dang refugee camp across the border in Thailand.

Mey and his family would ultimately become one of the thousands of Cambodian refugees who would be resettled in the U.S. state of Rhode Island. After a few years living as refugees, he and his family arrived in Rhode Island on February 12, 1982.

In 1993, Ros Mey was ordained a Buddhist monk at the Wat Thormikaram temple in Providence, Rhode Island, when he was 62 years old. In 1998, he became Chov Atika & President of the temple.

He died at the temple in Providence on December 12, 2010, at the age of 85.
