= Dagoberto Suárez Melo =

Governor of Guaviare Department
- In office 2010 – December 4, 2010
- Preceded by: Oscar López Cadavid
- Succeeded by: to be determined

Personal details
- Born: April 1975
- Died: December 4, 2010 (aged 35) Villavicencio, Meta Department, Colombia
- Party: National Integration Party (PIN)

Dagoberto Suárez Melo (died December 4, 2010) was a Colombian politician who served as the governor of Guaviare Department in 2010.

Suárez's predecessor as the Governor of Guaviare, Oscar López Cadavid, resigned from office due to an investigation over his alleged ties to drug traffickers and Pedro "Cuchillo" Oliveiro Guerrero, a militia leader.

Dagoberto Suárez, a member of the National Integration Party (PIN), was elected Governor of Guaviare in a special gubernatorial election in February 2010. Suarez garnered 11,777 votes in the election, while his nearest opponent, José Pérez Restrepo of the Colombian Conservative Party, placed second with 7,132 votes. Liberal candidate Janeth Solano came in a distant third place with 865 votes. Suárez's election ended twelve consecutive years of Conservative Party rule in Guaviare.

In the early morning of December 4, 2010, Governor Suárez was fatally injured in a car accident while driving on the road known for potholes from Granada, Meta to San José del Guaviare. He had been attending a regional forum in Granada on the previous day.

The accident took place in an area called Los Mangos, a rural section of the municipality of Puerto Concordia in Meta Department. Suarez suffered severe head injuries in the accident, including a cerebral hemorrhage and inflammation. He was flown by helicopter to the hospital, where he underwent surgery to relieve pressure to his brain. According to the director of the Hospital Departamental de Villavicencio, Dagoberto Suárez died during the operation at the age of 35, . Five of Suarez's bodyguards were treated and released from the hospital.

Paul Robledo, the deputy justice minister of Guaviare, became the acting governor until a permanent successor could be chosen.
