= Téclaire Bille =

Equatoguinean footballer

Personal information
- Full name: Téclaire Bille Esono
- Date of birth: 7 July 1988
- Place of birth: Douala, Cameroon
- Date of death: 15 December 2010 (aged 22)
- Place of death: Edéa, Cameroon
- Position: Defender

Senior career*
Years	Team	Apps	(Gls)
- Caïman d'Akwa
- Ngondi Nkam de Yabassi
- Louves Minprof de Yaoundé
- Bellas Artes

International career
2008–2010	Equatorial Guinea		
- * Club domestic league appearances and goals

Téclaire Bille Esono (7 July 1988 – 15 December 2010) was an Equatoguinean footballer. She played at a club level for Bellas Artes, and for the Equatorial Guinea women's national football team.

== Early life ==
Bille, who was born in Douala, Cameroon and later emigrated to Equatorial Guinea.

== Career ==
=== Club ===
She played as defender during her career in Cameroon, and for Equatorial Guinean club side Bellas Artes.

=== International ===
She played for the Equatorial Guinea women's national football team, and was a member of the team that lost in the final 4–2 against Nigeria in the 2010 African Women's Championship. This result qualified Equatorial Guinea for the following year's FIFA Women's World Cup in Germany.

== Death ==
She was killed, alongside her eldest brother and Pablo Boyas on 15 December 2010 in a traffic accident between Yaoundé and Douala in Cameroon. At the time of her death, she had already begun to prepare for the 2011 Women's World Cup. The Nigerian Football Federation released a statement consoling the player's death, saying that she performed "with verve and vivacity, commitment and passion".

== Honours ==
Equatorial Guinea

  - African Women's Championship: Winner in 2008 and runner-up in 2010
