= Diocese of Ubon Ratchathani =

Latin Catholic diocese in Thailand

Coordinates: 15°13′38″N 104°51′2″E

Diocese of Ubon Ratchathani Dioecesis Ubonratchathaniensis สังฆมณฑลอุบลราชธานี

Location
- Country: Thailand
- Ecclesiastical province: Thare and Nonseng
- Metropolitan: Thare and Nonseng

Statistics
- Area: 53,917 km^{2} (20,817 sq mi)
- Population: Total; Catholics: (as of 2010); 7,785,113; 26,242 (0.3%)

Information
- Denomination: Catholic
- Sui iuris church: Latin Church
- Rite: Roman Rite
- Cathedral: Cathedral of the Immaculate Conception in Ubon Ratchathani

Current leadership
- Pope: Leo XIV
- Bishop elect: Stephen Boonlert Phromsena
- Metropolitan Archbishop: Anthony Weradet Chaiseri
- Bishops emeritus: Philip Banchong Chaiyara

Map
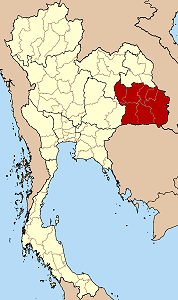
- Location of the Diocese of Ubon Ratchathani

The Diocese of Ubon Ratchathani (Dioecesis Ubonratchathaniensis, Thai: สังฆมณฑลอุบลราชธานี) is a Latin Catholic ecclesiastical jurisdiction located in north-east Thailand. It is a suffragan diocese of the Archdiocese of Thare and Nonseng.

The diocese covers an area of 53,917 square kilometres (20,817 sq mi), covering seven provinces of Thailand - Amnat Charoen, Maha Sarakham, Roi Et, Sisaket, Surin, Ubon Ratchathani and Yasothon. In 2001, of the 7.7 million citizens, 24,760 were members of the Catholic Church. It is divided into 55 parishes, with 42 priests altogether.

== History ==
The Vicariate Apostolic of Ubon was created on May 7, 1953, when the Vicariate Apostolic of Thare was split. In 1965, the western part of the territory was separated and became the Vicariate Apostolic of Nakhon Ratchasima. On December 18, 1965, the Vicariate Apostolic was elevated to a diocese.

== Cathedral ==
The cathedral of the diocese is the Cathedral of the Immaculate Conception, located in Ubon Ratchathani.

== Bishops ==
- Claudius Philippe Bayet, M.E.P.: May 7, 1953 - August 13, 1969 (resigned)
- Claude Germain Berthold, M.E.P.: April 9, 1970 - May 24, 1976 (resigned)
- Michael Bunluen Mansap: May 21, 1976 - March 25, 2006 (retired)
- Philip Banchong Chaiyara, C.Ss.R (March 25, 2006 – December 2, 2023)
- Stephen Boonlert Phromsena (December 2, 2023 – present)
