= Mariá Álvarez Rios =

Cuban composer, pianist and educator

Mariá Álvarez Rios (June 5, 1919 – December 6, 2010) was a Cuban composer, pianist and educator.

She was born in Tuinicú and studied music from a young age. She continued her studies at the University of Havana and the University of Michigan where she earned a doctorate in music. She wrote music to poems by Nicolás Guillén, José Martí, Félix Pita Rodríguez and Gabriela Mistral, and also wrote music for the stage; she was known for her contributions to children's music.

== Selected works ==
- Abrazame amor, song
- Anda di, corazo'n, song
- Ya no me llamas, song
- La rosa y el ruiseñor, song
- Como se duele, song
