= Boyas =

Equatoguinean footballer and manager

Personal information
- Full name: Pablo Ndong Esi
- Date of birth: 1969
- Place of birth: Equatorial Guinea
- Date of death: 15 December 2010 (age 41)
- Place of death: Near Edéa, Cameroon
- Position: Goalkeeper

International career
Years	Team	Apps	(Gls)
1999	Equatorial Guinea B	3	(0)
2002–2006	Equatorial Guinea	1	(0)

Managerial career
- 2010: Deportivo Mongomo

Pablo Ndong Esi (1969 – 15 December 2010), better known as Boyas, was an Equatoguinean football goalkeeper and manager.

The stadium located in Sampaka, a town between Luba and Malabo, is called "Estadio Pablo Boyas" as a posthumous honor.

== International career ==
Boyas was with the Equatoguinean senior team in 2002, when he participated of an Africa Cup of Nations 2004 Qualifying match against Sierra Leone on 8 September. In turn, he was substitute in an Africa Cup of Nations 2008 Qualifying match against Cameroon on 7 October 2006.

Boyas also had B matches in 1999, playing the UNIFAC Cup.

== Death ==
Boyas was killed, alongside the Equatoguinean women's international footballer Téclaire Bille and her eldest brother on 15 December 2010, in a road accident between Yaoundé and Douala in Cameroon. He was the head coach of Deportivo Mongomo.
