= Richard Griffith (physician) =

English physician

- Born: 1635?
- Died: September 1691
- Occupation: Physician

Richard Griffith (1635? – September 1691) was an English physician.

== Early life ==
Griffith was born about 1635. He was educated at Eton. On the recommendation of Cromwell and the council of state, he was appointed by the parliamentary visitors to a fellowship at University College, Oxford, on 1 September 1654. He graduated with a B.A. 7 July 1657, M.A. 3 May 1660, and had thoughts of becoming a preacher, However, ‘ not minded to conform he left the college, and applied his mind to the study of physic’. He took the degree of M.D. at Caen on 12 June 1664. He was admitted an honorary fellow of the Royal College of Physicians the following December.

== Career ==
He was created a fellow by the charter of James II and was admitted on 12 April 1687.

He was censor in 1688 and 1690, and registrar for 1690. For some years he practised at Richmond, Surrey.

== Legacy ==
He died in the parish of St. Nicholas Acons, London, in September 1691, and was buried in the church of Datchet, Buckinghamshire, near his deceased wife and child. In his will, dated on 4 Sept. 1691, and proved on the 8th, he mentions property at various places in Surrey and houses in Old Street, St. Luke's, London.

He married, first by license dated 18 Jan. 1678–9, Jane Wheeler of Datchet. They had a son Richard, baptised at Richmond on 13 March 1679-80 (parish register). He was buried with his mother at Datchet. His second wife, Mary was the daughter of Richard Blackman, apparently of Punchins, near Stoke-next-Guildford, Surrey. She survived him without issue.

Griffith was the author of a treatise entitled ‘A-la-Mode Phlebotomy no good fashion; or the copy of a Letter to Dr. [Francis] Hungerford [of Reading], complaining of…the phantastick behaviour and unfair dealing of some London physitians… Whereupon a fit occasion is taken to discourse of the profuse way of Blood-Letting,’ &c, 8vo, London, 1681. The immediate cause of Griffith's wrath was the treatment recommended by a London physician (formerly a 'journeyman' to Dr. Willis), who, summoned to see an aged lady patient of his at Richmond, insisted on her being let blood, which accelerated her death. Harwood, confuses Griffith with another Richard Griffith, a native of Abinger, Surrey, who passed from Eton to King's College, Cambridge, in 1629, and died in college at the close of 1642 (cf. Addit.
