= Michael Bunluen Mansap =

- Bishop of Ubon Ratchathani
- Native name: บุญเลื่อน หมั้นทรัพย์
- Church: Catholic Church
- Diocese: Diocese of Ubon Ratchathani
- In office: 21 May 1976 – 25 March 2006
- Predecessor: Germain-Louis-Émile Berthold
- Successor: Philip Banchong Chaiyara

Orders
- Ordination: 21 December 1951
- Consecration: 12 August 1976 by Germain-Louis-Émile Berthold

Personal details
- Born: 2 April 1929 Wat Phleng, Monthon Ratchaburi, Kingdom of Siam
- Died: 2 December 2010 (aged 81) Bangkok, Thailand

Michael Bunluen Mansap (Thai: บุญเลื่อน หมั้นทรัพย์; 2 April 1929 – 2 December 2010) was the Roman Catholic bishop of the Roman Catholic Diocese of Ubon Ratchathani, Thailand.

Ordained in 1951, Bunluen Mansap was named bishop of the Ubon Ratchathani Diocese in 1976. Bishop Mansap retired from overseeing the diocese in 2006. He died on 2 December 2010, at Bangkok hospital aged 81 years old.
