= Famine in Somalia =

Famine in Somalia may refer to:

- 1992 famine in Somalia, which killed 200,000–300,000 people in Somalia
- 2011 East Africa drought, which killed 260,000 people in Somalia
