= Qian Yunhui =

Qian Yunhui 钱云会
- Born: c. 1957; Zhaiqiao, Yueqing, Wenzhou, Zhejiang, China
- Died: 25 December 2010 (aged 53); Zhaiqiao, Yueqing, Wenzhou, Zhejiang, China
- Occupations: Local politician, activist, land rights campaigner

Qian Yunhui
- Simplified Chinese: 钱云会
Transcriptions
Standard Mandarin
- Hanyu Pinyin: Qián yún huì

Qian Yunhui (Chinese: 钱云会, 1957 – 25 December 2010) was an elected and popular eastern Zhejiang province village head who had a long history of petitioning against alleged abuses by local government, who died on December 25, 2010 after being crushed by the front wheel of a truck loaded with crushed rocks for a nearby building site operated by the Yueqing Electric Power Plant.

Shortly after his death, rumors emerged stating that Qian was held on the ground by four men in security personnel uniforms while the truck was driven slowly over him. A government press conference a week later announced that Qian had died in an ordinary traffic accident, struck and killed crossing the road. An eyewitness by the name of Qian Chengwei (Chinese: 钱成委) said that he saw that four uniformed men held the victim down on the ground while the truck went on top of him. The eyewitness had since been arrested and detained by the police. Other eyewitnesses including villager Huang Diyan (Chinese: 黄迪燕), claimed she saw four uniformed men with gloves struggle with Qian and then put his body under the front tire by force. The truck's owner and driver, Fei Liangyu (Chinese: 费良玉) was detained by the police, along with other villagers who questioned the police's investigation, including Qian's daughter.

His family was paid 1.05 million Yuan (US$159,000).

== Internet response in China ==
Chinese online activist Wu Gan was among the first citizen reporters to visit the crime scene, and began interviewing local eyewitness. Wu has obtained a police video of the crime scene right after the victim's dead body being removed, and had since posted the video online. Wu regularly posted comments on Twitter and other internet platforms, and with the help of a group of Chinese lawyers, is offering free legal aid to villagers in need.

Activist Xu Zhiyong also went to crime scene to conduct his own investigation.
