= Abdumalik Bahori =

Abdumalik Bahori (Tajik: Абдумалик Баҳорӣ, 22 March 1927 Leninabad, USSR - 3 December 2010, Dushanbe, Tajikistan) was a children's poet and the first Tajikistani fiction writer. He was born into a middle-class family who worked in the silk producing industry. He graduated from Leninabad Pedagogical Institute (now known as Khujand State University) in 1946.

Bahori was a writer who predicted cell phones and the possible cloning of humans.

- Dili beqaror - Дили беқарор 1962
- Qarzi juragi - Қарзи ҷӯрагӣ
- Ajoiboit Nodar - Аҷоиботи Нодар 1972
- Sunbula - Сунбула 1974

For his great contribution to the development of Tajik literature, he was awarded the title of "People's Writer of Tajikistan" and was a laureate of the State Prize of Tajikistan named after A. Rudaki. He was awarded the Order of the Badge of Honor (April 24, 1957).
