= William Harding le Riche =

Canadian epidemiologist

Professor William Harding le Riche FRCPC
- Born: March 21, 1916; Dewetsdorp, Orange Free State, South Africa
- Died: December 31, 2010 (aged 94); Toronto, Ontario, Canada
- Occupation: Epidemiologist

William Harding le Riche (21 March 1916 – 31 December 2010) was a South African–born Canadian epidemiologist. He was Professor of Epidemiology (emeritus) at the University of Toronto.

Le Riche was born in Dewetsdorp, Orange Free State, South Africa and first studied at the University of the Witwatersrand in Johannesburg, where he gained a Bachelor of Science (B.Sc.) in 1936. He died in Toronto, Ontario, Canada.

== Education ==
He was educated at University of the Witwatersrand.B.Sc. 1936, MB.ChB. 1943, MD 1949. He received a Carnegie Research Grant, Bureau for Education and Social Research, Pretoria 1937-1939. Harvard University (Rockefeller fellowship) M.P.H. (cum laude) 1949-50. He had an internship at Zulu McCord Hospital, Durban 1944.

== Employment ==
- Appointed by Union Health Department to Health Centre Service firstly at Pholela, Natal and later (1945) established first Health Centre for Whites and Eurafricans at Knysna, South Africa. 1945-1949.
- Epidemiologist Union (Fed) Health Department, South Africa 1950-1952
- Consultant in Epidemiology, Department of National Health and Welfare, Ottawa (worked on background report of Canadian Sickness Survey 1952-1954.
- Research Medical Officer, Physicians Service Inc. Toronto, Ontario 1954-1957
- Department of Public Health, School of Hygiene, University of Toronto 1959
- Professor and Head of Department of Epidemiology, University of Toronto, 1962-1975.
- Professor of Epidemiology, Department of Preventive Medicine, 1975–1982
- Professor Emeritus from 1982

In reference to his higher qualifications, the MD was by thesis: Studies in Health, Growth and Nutrition. The FRCPC was in the area of Medical Science 1973. The F.A.C.P. was in Preventive Medicine

His research interests were wide. In 1936 he and Dr G. Schepers took the famous paleontologist, Doctor Robert Broom, to the Sterkfontein caves, near Johannesburg, South Africa, where Broom made important discoveries of hominid fossils, Australopithecus africanus.

== Professional positions and appointments ==
In his University teaching he saw epidemiology as a broad comprehensive subject studying the determinants of disease. From this point of view epidemiology includes the basic medical sciences, microbiology, environmental chemistry and clinical medicine. However, by 1975, in the English speaking academic world, epidemiology had become a narrow statistical subject, involved mainly with analysis and past epidemic surveys and clinical trials. The Department of Epidemiology and Biometrics grew and M.Sc. and Ph.D. Programs were developed.

Between 1950 and 1980 the pundits were claiming antibiotics would solve the problems of most infectious disease. The fact that bacteria develop resistance to medicaments was not considered. In 1973 le Riche and Dr. Michael Lenczner raised the importance of infectious and tropical disease imported into Canada by travellers, immigrants and refugees. Governments were not interested in these situations.

By 1981 it became clear that AIDS (acquired immune deficiency syndrome) was a serious infectious disease.
In 1953 he received a part-time commission in the Canadian Armed Forces, serving in the 23rd Field Ambulance, under Lieut. Col. David Thompson in Ottawa. In 1968 he became a member of the Defence Research Board and for many years he was Consultant on preventive medicine to the Defence Medical Council. Outside the University he served on many committees including those of the Ontario Medical Association and the Canadian Medical Association.

During 1966-72 he was on the Metropolitan Toronto Hospital Planning Council under the chairmanship of Dr. H. Hoyle Campbell, plastic surgeon, who with Dr. Shouldice, pioneered outpatient surgery in Toronto. Some of the excellent recommendations of the Council were carried out in 1998 and 1999. For many years he served as the Medical Research Council Associate Committee on Hospital Infections, Chairman Professor E.G.D. Murray. As a result of this association the book on "The Control of Infections in Hospitals" was published in 1966. Other committees were the Professional Education Committee of the American Public Health Association, Examiners Committee, Public Health and Preventive Medicine, Royal College of Physicians and Surgeons of Canada, Nursing Research Committee, Ontario Council of Health Care 1969, Physicians Services Inc. Research Grants Committee, Second International Conference on Agriculture, University of Reading, England, Committee, Canadian Cancer Research Foundation, Committee on Acupuncture, Ontario Council of Health, Report on Reorganization of the City of Toronto Health Department. He was Chairman of the Canadian Society for Tropical Medicine and International Health 1976-1978.
He was a member of the Committee on Preventive Medicine, Medical Council of Canada.

In the University he was on the Planning Strategy Committee, Planning and Priorities Subcommittee, and many others. Research on Medical Care included surveys on the work of Medical Officers of Health in Ontario, and the work of Optometrists and Ophthalmologists in Ontario.
For a few weeks he was visiting professor, Wayne County Medical School, Detroit and Distinguished Lecturer at Dalhousie Medical School.

In 1956 he first appeared with Dr. Arthur Kelly, Canadian Medical Association on a television program. This was the beginning of a 25-year career in radio, television and the daily press, which covered many aspects of health care, nutrition and communicable diseases, and medical politics. He became a good communicator, and public speaker. His academic interests were nutrition, infections, populations, and environmental destruction. He was a Fellow of the American Public Health Association and Fellow of the Royal Society of Tropical Medicine. For 18 years he was on the part-time staff of the Department of Family Practice and Extended Care at Sunnybrook Hospital. He was awarded the Defries medal and granted Honorary Membership of the Canadian Public Health Association. He became a Life Member of the Ontario Medical Association and was granted Senior Membership of The Canadian Medical Association.

== Personal ==
Le Riche married Margaret Cardross Grant on 11 December 1943. They had five children. His hobbies, at various time of his life included camping, photography, and he rode regularly until the age of 70. He was interested in music, opera and live theatre, and attended St. Timothy's Anglican Church, Toronto, Ontario.

== Publications ==
Le Riche wrote a substantial number of scientific papers, letters-to-the-editor, chapters in books and books and articles, including the following:

- Physique and Nutrition, 158pp. SA Council for Education and Social Research. Van Schaik. Pretoria 1940
- A Health Survey of African children in Alexandra Township. 3510 cases. University of the Witwatersrand Press. 1943

This work was undertaken at the request of Mr. Humphrey Raikes, Principle of the University

- With Dr. S.L. Kark: A Somatometric Study of S.A. Bantu School Children (6,443 cases) part of a study on Nutrition and Health of Bantu School Children Manpower 31.2-140 Pretoria. 1944
- Smallpox Control in the Swartkop Native Location. Clinical Proceedings 4:280-283. 1944

The smallpox outbreak was controlled by vaccinating people in their homes. This method was used by The World Health Organization to eliminate smallpox from the world, finally reported in 1980.

- Various reports on disease incidence in insured populations were prepared for Physicians Services Inc. The data were found useful by number of American insurance companies
- In the sixties he produced a number of papers on clinical trials of pharmaceuticals. This is now called "clinical epidemiology".
- With collaborators: The Control of Infections in Hospitals with special reference to a Survey in Ontario, University of Toronto Press. 341 pp. 1966
- "World Incidence and Prevalence of the major Communicable Disease. Edited by Gordon Wolstenholme and Maeve O'Connor. J and A Churchill. London 1967.
- "Epidemiology and Method of spread of Viral Infections". In Textbook of Virology by Rhodes A.J. and Van Rooyen, C.E. 5th Edition 1968 Williams and Wilkins Co. Baltimore pp 168–187
- With collaborators. People look at Doctors. The Sunnybrook Health Attitude Study. Published by Department of Family and Community Medicine. Sunnybrook Hospital 1971
- le Riche, WH; Milner, Jean (1971). Epidemiology as medical ecology. Edinburgh: Churchill Livingstone. ISBN 9780700014811.
- Medical Science, pp 101–109 in Calder, Nigel. Nature in the Round. A Guide to Environmental Science. Weidenfeld & Nicolson London, 1973
- The Complete Family Book of Nutrition Meal Planning. Hume Publishing Company, Don Mills 1976 pp 242
- le Riche, WH (1982). A chemical feast : a consumer's guide to chemicals, diet, and disease. New York, NY: Facts on File. ISBN 9780871966438.
- le Riche, WH (2000). "Chapter 27: The bottom line". In Lanza, Robert (ed.). One world : the health and survival of the human species in the 21st century. Santa Fe, New Mexico: Health Press. pp. 231–246. ISBN 9780929173337.
