= Poul Andersen (footballer, born 1928) =

Danish footballer (1928–2010)

Personal information
- Date of birth: 16 February 1928
- Date of death: 8 December 2010 (aged 82)
- Position: Midfielder

Senior career*
| Years | Team | Apps | (Gls) |
- B.93
- * Club domestic league appearances and goals

Poul Andersen (16 February 1928 – 8 December 2010) was a Danish footballer who competed in the 1952 Summer Olympics.
