= Karen Sortito =

American marketing executive (1961–2010)

Karen Christine Sortito (September 8, 1961 – December 13, 2010) was a specialist in brand enhancement and product placement. Sortito was a pioneer in product tie-ins in movies. An example of one of the first product tie-ins was in the movie E.T. In the story, the stranded alien character, E.T. was lured out of hiding with a trail of Reese's Pieces.

Karen Sortito was born in New Haven, Connecticut. Her father, John, worked for the New Haven Parking Authority; her mother, Phyllis, was a bookkeeper. Sortito was a graduate of Southern Connecticut State University where she worked at the fledgling cable channel MTV. While there she rose to director of marketing and promotion. Later, Sortito moved from New York to Los Angeles in the late 1980s. While in Los Angeles, she worked for 20th Century Fox, MGM/UA among other Hollywood film companies. While there she earned a reputation for being a brash, intelligent and forthright character.

Sortito came to prominence in 1995 when she created the BMW product tie-in for the James Bond film GoldenEye. The BMW car, a Z3, was a new model at the time. Afterwards, while the film was number one at the box office, sales of the car spiked. For the next film in the Bond franchise, Tomorrow Never Dies, Sortito created a $100 million promotional campaign that included tie-ins with Visa, L'Oréal, Ericsson, Heineken, Avis rental cars and Omega watches. This time the film brought in more than $300 million but the product placements were criticized. Sortito defended the product placements. "It's all cool and hip. If this wasn't creative, we would not be doing it."

Sortito was used to contributing outlandish ideas. She once suggested a Bond tie-in to the lingerie maker Victoria's Secret, in which an actress would be clad in a diamond-studded bra that also happened to spray nerve gas. "I thought it was campy, the filmmakers thought it was crass," Sortito said of the idea.

Most recently Sortito was head of the entertainment division of NYC and Company, New York city's marketing and tourism organization. She created promotions to coincide with the 2007 release of Spider-Man 3 and a celebration of the 40th anniversary of Sesame Street in 2009.
