= Anthony Weradet Chaiseri =

Archbishop of Thare and Nonseng, Thailand since 2020

The Most Reverend Anthony Weradet Chaiseri
- Archbishop of Thare and Nonseng
- Archdiocese: Thare and Nonseng, Thailand
- Appointed: 13 May 2020
- Predecessor: Louis Chamniern Santisukniram

Orders
- Ordination: 21 March 1992
- Consecration: 15 August 2020 by Louis Chamniern Santisukniram

Personal details
- Born: 26 June 1963 (age 63) Thare, Thailand
- Denomination: Roman Catholic

Anthony Weradet Chaiseri (born 26 June 1963) is a Thai Roman Catholic prelate who has been serving as archbishop of the Archdiocese of Thare and Nonseng, Thailand, since 2020.

== Biography ==
Anthony Weradet Chaiseri was born on 26 June 1963 in Thare, Thailand. He attended the diocesan seminary in Thare and then studied philosophy and theology at the Lux Mundi National Seminary in Sam Phran, where he obtained his bachelor's degree. After attending a course of spiritual formation at the Focolare Center in Tagaytay, Philippines from 1991 to 1992, he was ordained a priest on 21 March 1992.

From 1992 to 1993, he served as parish priest of St Anne's Cathedral, Nongseng, and from 1993 to 1995, as parish priest of St Joseph's, Nakhon Phanom. After attending further theological studies in Rome, he returned to Tha Rae where he served as formator at the Fatima Minor Seminary from 1997 to 1998, and then as rector there from 1998 to 2008. From 2008 to 2013, he served as vicar-general and parish priest of the Sacred Heart of Jesus, Sakon Nakhon, and then from 2013 to 2018 as vicar-general and parish priest of the Cathedral of St Michael the Archangel at Thare.

In 2020, after serving for two years as vicar-general of the see of Thare and Nonseng and parish priest of the Shrine of the Mother of the Martyrs at Song Khon, he was appointed Archbishop of Thare and Nonseng on 13 May 2020, and was consecrated at the Archangel Michael Cathedral, Thare, on 15 August 2020.

== See also ==
- Catholic Church in Thailand
