= Tha Rae =

Coordinates: 17°15′22.5″N 100°11′31.6″E

Tha Rae ท่าแร่
- Tambon
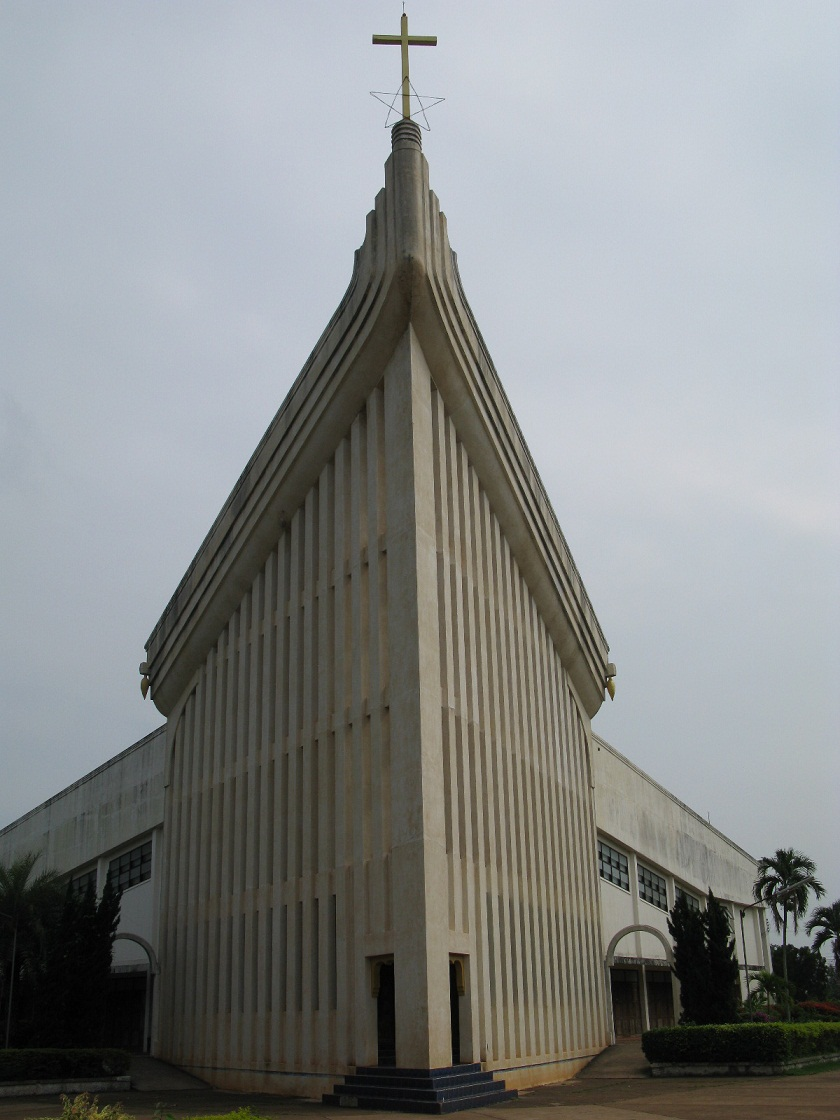
- St. Michael's Cathedral
- Interactive map of Tha Rae
- Country: Thailand
- Province: Sakon Nakhon
- District: Mueang Sakon Nakhon
- Time zone: UTC+7 (ICT)

Tha Rae (or spelled: Tharae and Thare; Thai: ท่าแร่, pronounced [tʰâː rɛ̂ː]), also known as Ban Tha Rae (บ้านท่าแร่, [bâːn tʰâː rɛ̂ː]), is a tambon (sub-district) and community of Mueang Sakon Nakhon District, Sakon Nakhon Province, northeastern Thailand (Isan).

== History ==
Tha Rae was founded in 1884 by a French missionary named Xavier Guego, who evacuated his family from downtown Sakon Nakhon across Nong Han Lake to set up a new residence on the lake's northern shore. They founded a Roman Catholic church called St. Michael's Cathedral. The first settlers in Tha Rae were made up of about 10 households of Vietnamese Christian immigrants and 10 households of native Isan, totaling more than 20 households. These Vietnamese families were primarily Catholics fleeing religious persecution in Vietnam during the mid-19th century, settling in the Sakon Nakhon region under the patronage of French missionaries. Currently, the village has around 2,200 households.

That is why Tha Rae is the largest Catholic community in Thailand. It is governed by Roman Catholic Archdiocese of Thare and Nonseng.

Moreover, especially in the past, Tha Rae was notorious for being a trading centre for dog meat exported to neighbouring countries, including local consumption. But from the insistence of local people that at present, the trade of dog and popular consumption of dog meat has decreased considerably.

Nowadays, Tha Rae is regarded as the old town zone of Sakon Nakhon. Along the main street, there are still old colonial buildings standing.

== Geography ==
Tha Rae is about 21 km (13 mi) from downtown Sakon Nakhon via Sakon Nakhon–Nakhon Phanom Highway, 14 km (8 mi) from Sakon Nakhon Airport.

Neighbouring sub-districts are (from north clockwise): Na Phiang in Kusuman District, Na Kaeo in Phon Na Kaeo District, Nong Lat in its district, and Chiang Khruea in its district.

The landscape of Tha Rae is a rural–urban fringe. Each muban (village) is near each other, but there are some villages that are about 1 km (about 1093 yd) away. Most of the area is lowland alongside the lake of Nong Han.

== Economy ==
Most Tha Rae residents work in rice cultivation. Nong Han freshwater fishing and fruit farming are fallbacks.

In recent decades, the local economy has gradually diversified to include heritage tourism, driven by the preservation of the village's historic architecture and its annual cultural festivals.

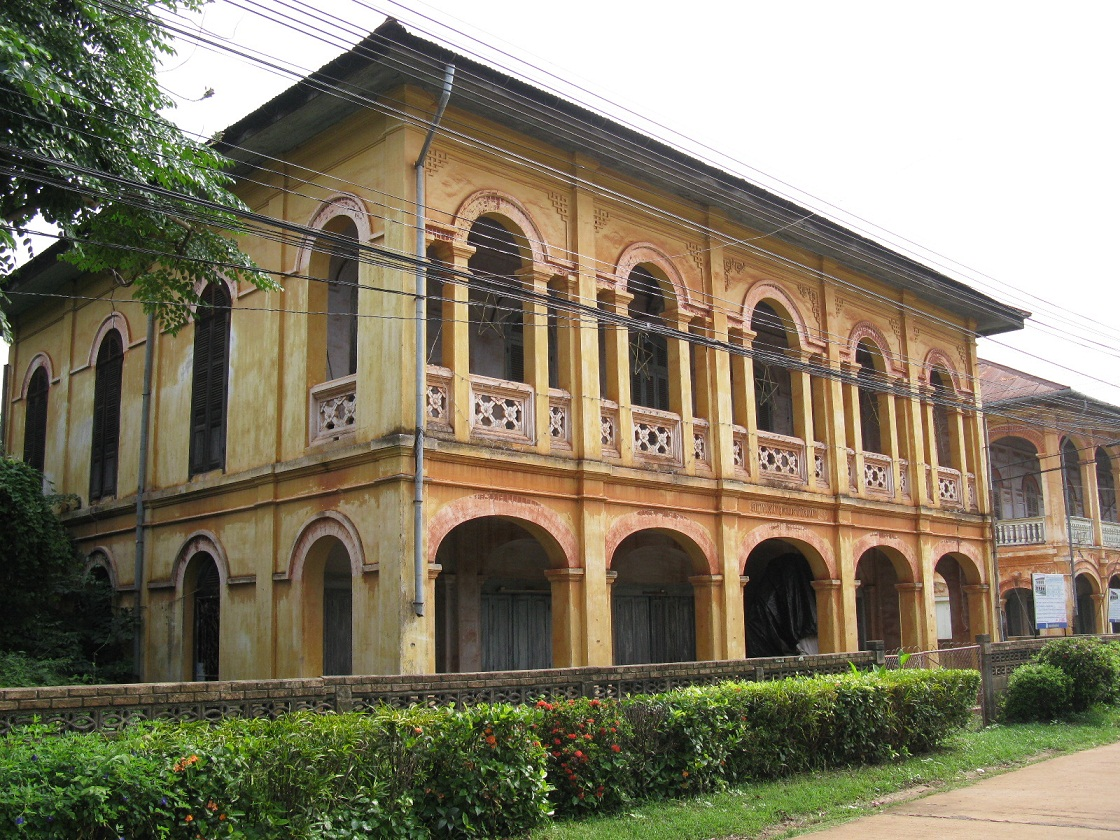
Udomdejwat Mansion, one of old colonial buildings

== Administration ==
Tha Rae is administered by the local government, subdistrict-municipality Tha Rae (เทศบาลตำบลท่าแร่).

Tha Rae is also divided into eight administrative villages.

== Places ==
- St Michael's Cathedral, Tha Rae
- Old colonial buildings
- Historic merchant houses and the Bishop's Residence, which exhibit a distinct blend of French colonial and traditional Vietnamese architectural elements, reflecting the community's 19th-century origins.

== Local tradition ==
Due to being the largest Catholic community in Thailand, Tha Rae has a local tradition that's the only one in the world. Known as the "Tha Rae Star Procession", the tradition is to celebrate Christmas every year.

The community hosts a Christmas star parade along the road from Tha Rae to other areas in Mueang Sakon Nakhon, since they believe the star (Star of Bethlehem) is the symbol of Jesus of Nazareth. The parade is decorated with big stars and electric lighting. It reflects Christians' belief that Jesus was born in the human world. Every year, there are around 200 star parades. This festival has been held continuously for over 100 years every night on December 24 (Christmas Eve). It has built a great reputation for Tha Rae.

== See also ==
- Catholic Church in Thailand
