= Rick Griffiths =

- Born: 1948; Curlewis, Gunnedah, New South Wales
- Died: 13 December 2010 (aged 62); Maitland, New South Wales
- Occupation: Chief executive
- Employer: Mindaribba Local Aboriginal Land Council
- Title: Aboriginal and Torres Strait Islander Commissioner
- Term: 2002–2005
- Spouse: Robyn
- Children: Five

Rick Griffiths (1948 – 13 December 2010) was an Aboriginal Australian activist and representative. He was the CEO of the Mindaribba Local Aboriginal Land Council and one of the final Aboriginal and Torres Strait Islander Commissioners prior to the abolition of the commission.

== Background ==
Griffiths was born in 1948 in the town of Curlewis, outside Gunnedah, New South Wales. He subsequently moved to the Hunter Region where he lived for the rest of his life. Griffiths was a passionate rugby league player, coach and administrator, and was responsible for establishing coaching camps for young Aboriginal players. He also established an Aboriginal rugby league coaching clinic at the University of Newcastle, producing up to 60 Aboriginal coaches, with many going on to become prominent coaches in their own communities.

== Career ==
Griffiths became involved in Aboriginal affairs in 1982 when he co-ordinated the Aboriginal Home Care pilot program.

He was subsequently appointed as the chief executive officer of the Mindaribba Local Aboriginal Land Council in 1992, considered by government to be the best of the 119 land councils. In his capacity as CEO, Griffiths became involved in deliberations concerning land development and mining on Aboriginal lands.

In 2002, Griffiths was elected to the Aboriginal and Torres Strait Islander Commission (ATSIC) as Commissioner for the Eastern Zone. He remained in that position until ATSIC was abolished by the Howard government in 2005.

In 2005, an image of Griffiths was printed on local school "currency" used to train students about the value of money.

In 2007, Griffiths was described in the New South Wales Legislative Assembly as "a man of vast experience and great ability who has long championed the cause of Aboriginal Australians".

In late 2010 Griffiths was diagnosed with lung cancer. He died on 13 December 2010.
