= Archdiocese of Thare and Nonseng =

Latin Catholic archdiocese in Thailand

Archdiocese of Thare and Nonseng Archidioecesis Tharensis et Nonsengensis อัครสังฆมณฑลท่าแร่-หนองแสง

Location
- Country: Thailand
- Ecclesiastical province: Thare and Nonseng

Statistics
- Area: 25,477 km^{2} (9,837 sq mi)
- Population: Total; Catholics: (as of 2010); 3,171,478; 44,078 (1.4%)

Information
- Denomination: Catholic
- Sui iuris church: Latin Church
- Rite: Roman Rite
- Cathedral: Cathedral of St Michael the Archangel in Tha Rae
- Co-cathedral: Co-Cathedral of St Anne in Nakhon Phanom

Current leadership
- Pope: Leo XIV
- Archbishop: Anthony Weradet Chaiseri

Map
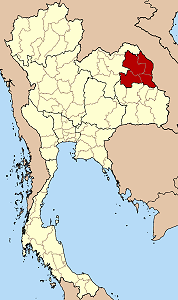
- Location of the Archdiocese of Thare and Nonseng

Website
- genesis.in.th

The Archdiocese of Thare and Nonseng (Archidioecesis Tharensis et Nonsengensis; Thai: อัครสังฆมณฑลท่าแร่-หนองแสง, RTGS: Akkhrasangkhamonthon Tha Rae-Nong Saeng) is a Latin Catholic ecclesiastical jurisdiction located in the north-east of Thailand. It is based in Tha Rae, a subdistrict municipality (thesaban tambon) in the Mueang Sakon Nakhon district.

== Area ==
The diocese covers an area of 25,477 km², covering four provinces of Thailand - Kalasin, Mukdahan, Nakhon Phanom and Sakon Nakhon. As of 2001, of the 3.1 million citizen 49,489 are member of the Catholic Church. It is divided into 30 parishes, having 51 priests altogether. By December 31, 2006, the archdiocese had 51,275 Catholics, 1.61 percent of the territory's population.

3 dioceses are suffragans of the archdiocese:

- Nakhon Ratchasima
- Ubon Ratchathani
- Udon Thani

== History ==
The archdiocese traces its origin back to the Vicariate Apostolic of Laos, which was established on May 4, 1899, responsible for all of what is now northeast Thailand and modern-day Laos. The seat of the vicariate was at Ban Nonseng, Nakhon Phanom Province. In 1938 the northern part was split off to create the Prefecture Apostolic of Vientiane and Luang-Prabang. After the independence of Laos in 1949 the vicariate was divided: on December 21, 1950, the Laotian part was split off to create the Prefecture Apostolic of Thakhek, while the Thai part became the Vicariate Apostolic of Thare. In 1960 it was renamed the Vicariate Apostolic of Thare and Nonseng, and was promoted as the Archdiocese of Thare and Nonseng on December 18, 1965.

== Cathedral ==
The St. Michael the Archangel Cathedral is located in Ban Tha Rae, Tha Rae subdistrict, Mueang Sakon Nakhon district, at the northern shore of the Nong Han Lake, 17°15′15″N 104°11′3″E.

== Bishops ==
Before Thare and Nonseng became a diocese, the administrator had the title vicar, but was also a titular bishop. The ordinary was raised to Archbishop on 18 December 1965.

- Joseph Marie Cuaz, M.E.P.: June 22, 1899 - 1912
- Constant-Jean Prodhomme, M.E.P.: June 2, 1913 - August 20, 1920
- Ange-Marie Joseph Gouin, M.E.P.: April 26, 1922 - July 1, 1943
- Henri-Albert Thomine, M.E.P.: July 29, 1944 - March 21, 1945
- Claudius Philippe Bayet, M.E.P.: April 10, 1947 - May 7, 1953
- Michael Mongkhol On Prakhongchit, May 7, 1953 - January 23, 1958
- Michel Kien Samophithak: February 12, 1959 - March 6, 1980
- Lawrence Khai Saen-Phon-On: March 6, 1980 - May 14, 2004
- Louis Chamniern Santisukniram: July 1, 2005 - May 13, 2020
- Anthony Weradet Chaiseri: May 13, 2020 - present

== Sources ==
- catholic-hierarchy
