= Robert Macauley =

American businessman (1923–2010)

Robert Conover "Bob" Macauley (December 11, 1923 – December 26, 2010) was an American businessman who left his paper company to create the charity AmeriCares, which he established in 1982 and which has provided billions of dollars of aid to needy people in crisis situations in countries around the world. Macauley had been aiding South Vietnamese orphans starting in the early 1970s and expanded his personal involvement in philanthropic causes after the 1975 crash of a U.S. military jet evacuating children stranded the survivors and others trying to leave the country.

== Biography ==
Macauley was born on December 11, 1923, in Manhattan. Raised in Greenwich, Connecticut, he attended Phillips Academy and then Yale University, where he shared a room with George H. W. Bush. He served in North Africa with the United States Army Air Corps and earned his undergraduate degree from Yale after completing his military service. He joined his family business and established the Virginia Fibre Corporation in 1972.

Macauley first became involved in major charitable efforts following the Tan Son Nhut C-5 accident in April 1975, in which a United States Air Force Lockheed C-5 Galaxy carrying South Vietnamese orphans as part of Operation Babylift, crashed on landing killing more than 150 and leaving 175 survivors, many of them among the 2,000 children awaiting transportation to the United States in the days before the Fall of Saigon to North Vietnamese forces later that month. When he learned that it would take more than a week to evacuate the surviving orphans due to the lack of military transport planes, Macauley chartered a Boeing 747 from Pan American World Airways and arranged for 300 orphaned children to leave the country, paying for the trip by mortgaging his house.

Macauley founded AmeriCares in 1982, a year after he organized shipments of humanitarian aid to Poland at the behest of Pope John Paul II and had organized an airlift to provide medicine to victims of the Lebanese Civil War. Accepting no pay, he was chief executive officer of the charity until 2002, distributing material collected from companies to people in need in trouble spots around the world.

In 1991, Macauley received the S. Roger Horchow Award for Greatest Public Service by a Private Citizen, an award given annually by Jefferson Awards.

A resident of North Palm Beach, Florida, New Canaan, Connecticut and Brewster, New York, Macauley died at the age of 87 at his Florida home on December 26, 2010, due to emphysema. He was survived by his wife Leila, as well as by a daughter, a son, a stepson and four grandchildren.
