= Royal Academy Exhibition of 1788 =

1788 art exhibition in London

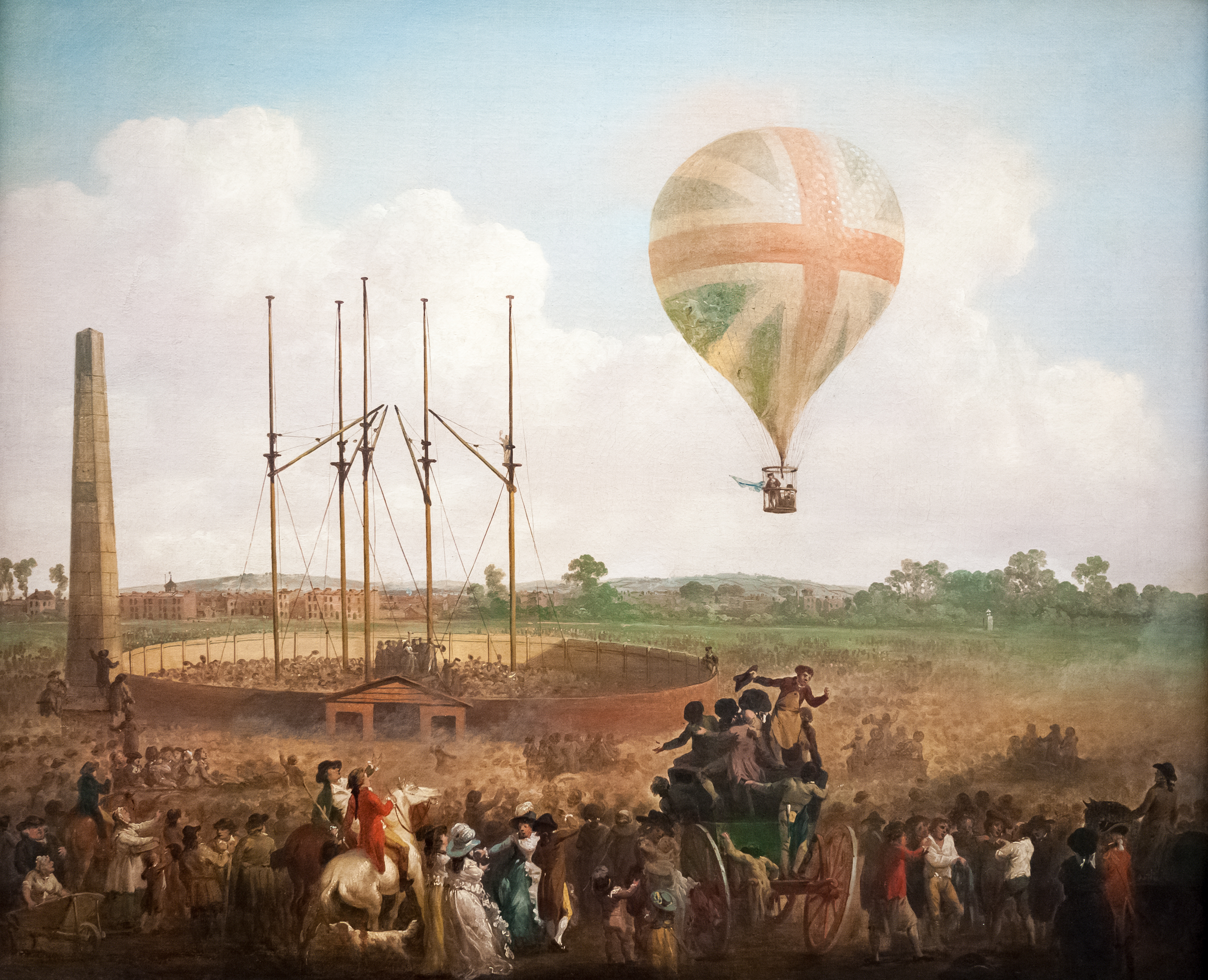
The Ascent of Lunardi's Balloon from St George's Fields by Julius Caesar Ibbetson

The Royal Academy Exhibition of 1788 was the twentieth annual Summer Exhibition of the British Royal Academy of Arts. It was held at Somerset House in London between 28 April and 7 June 1788. The President of the Royal Academy Joshua Reynolds was again the dominant force at the exhibition, submitting seventeen paintings. This included The Infant Hercules a commission for the Russian Empress Catherine the Great, which drew a mixed reception from art critics. His portraits included Lady Elizabeth Foster and Portrait of Lord Heathfield. depicting the victorious commander during the Great Siege of Gibraltar.

Benjamin West displayed the history painting Queen Philippa Interceding for the Lives of the Burghers of Calais. His fellow American Mather Brown selected another scene from British history The Warrant Read to Mary, Queen of Scots. Based in Rome, Angelica Kauffman sent in the Neoclassical Bacchus Teaching the Nymphs to Make Verses. Julius Caesar Ibbetson exhibited a depiction of the 1785 ascent of the hot air balloon designed by Vincenzo Lunardi from St George's Fields in Southwark three years earlier.

William Marlow displayed cityscapes featuring the River Thames at Blackfriars Bridge, London Bridge and Westminster Bridge. In sculpture the aristocratic amateur Anne Seymour Damer drew praise for her works, as did Thomas Banks. The Boydell Shakespeare Gallery and Thomas Macklin's Poet Gallery both featured work by prominent exhibitors to the Royal Academy and offered some competition to it. Two months after the exhibition Thomas Gainsborough, who had been a founded member of the Academy but had been boycotting it since 1784, died at his home Schomberg House in Pall Mall.

== Gallery ==
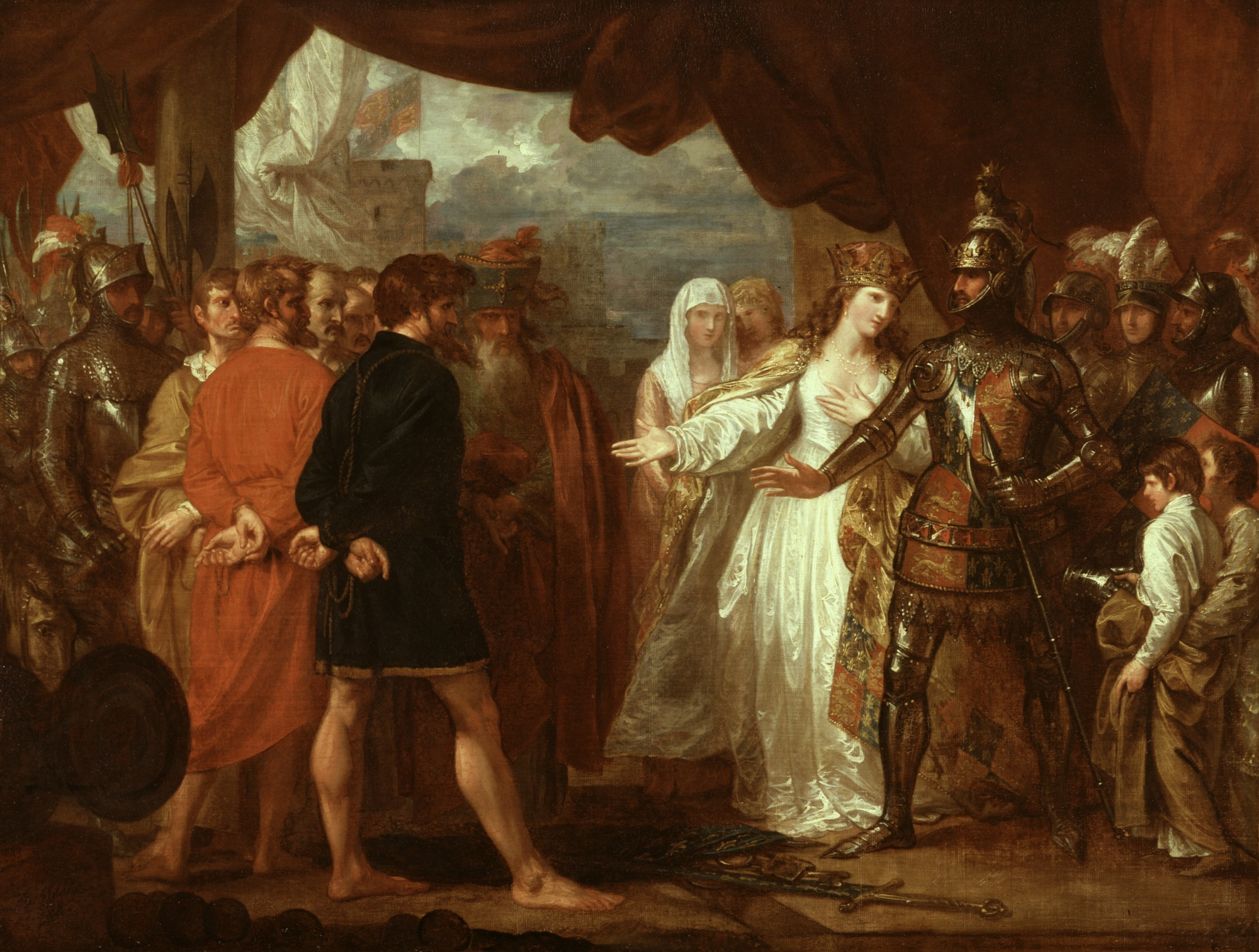
Queen Philippa Interceding for the Lives of the Burghers of Calais by Benjamin West

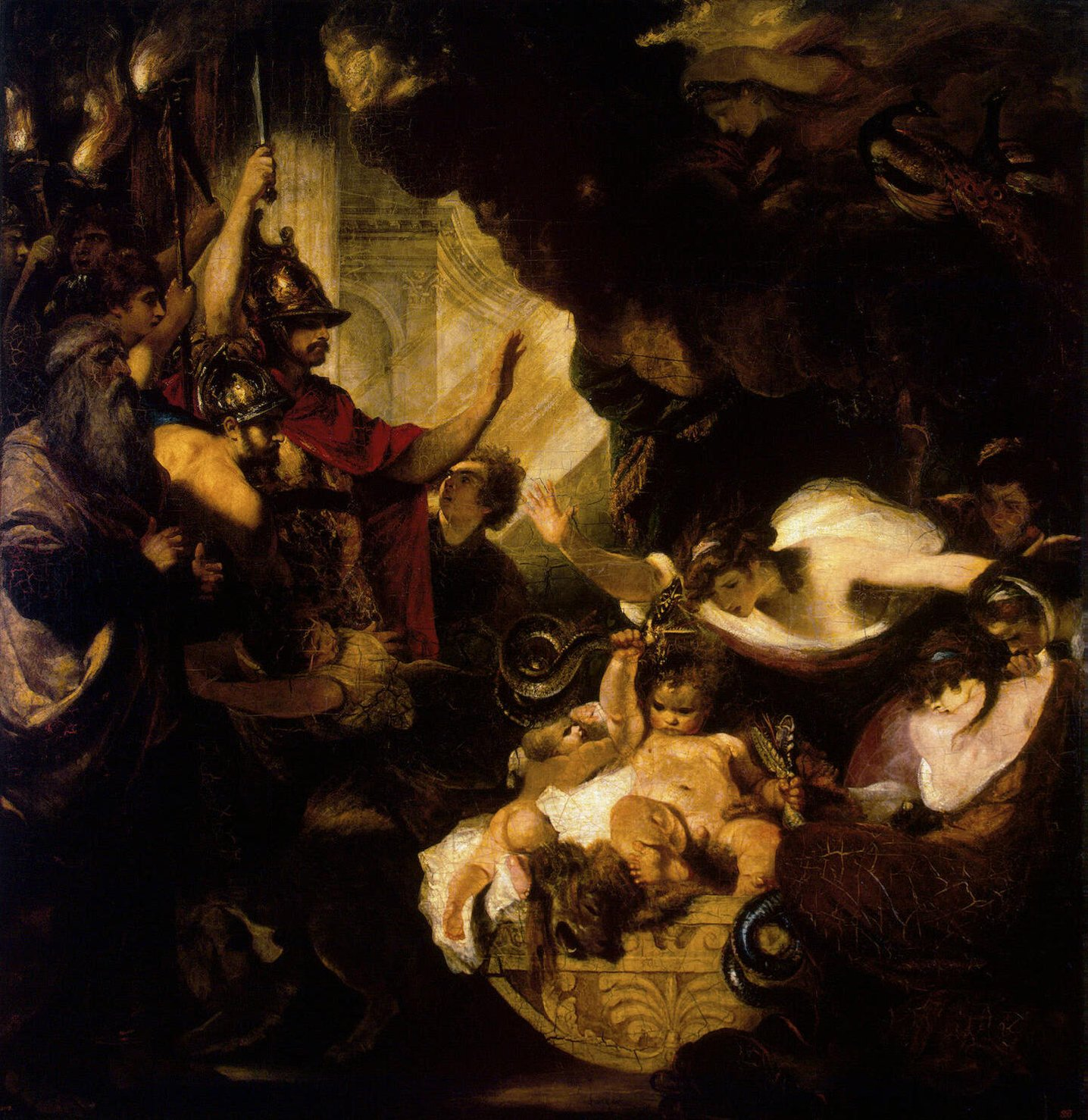
The Infant Hercules by Joshua Reynolds

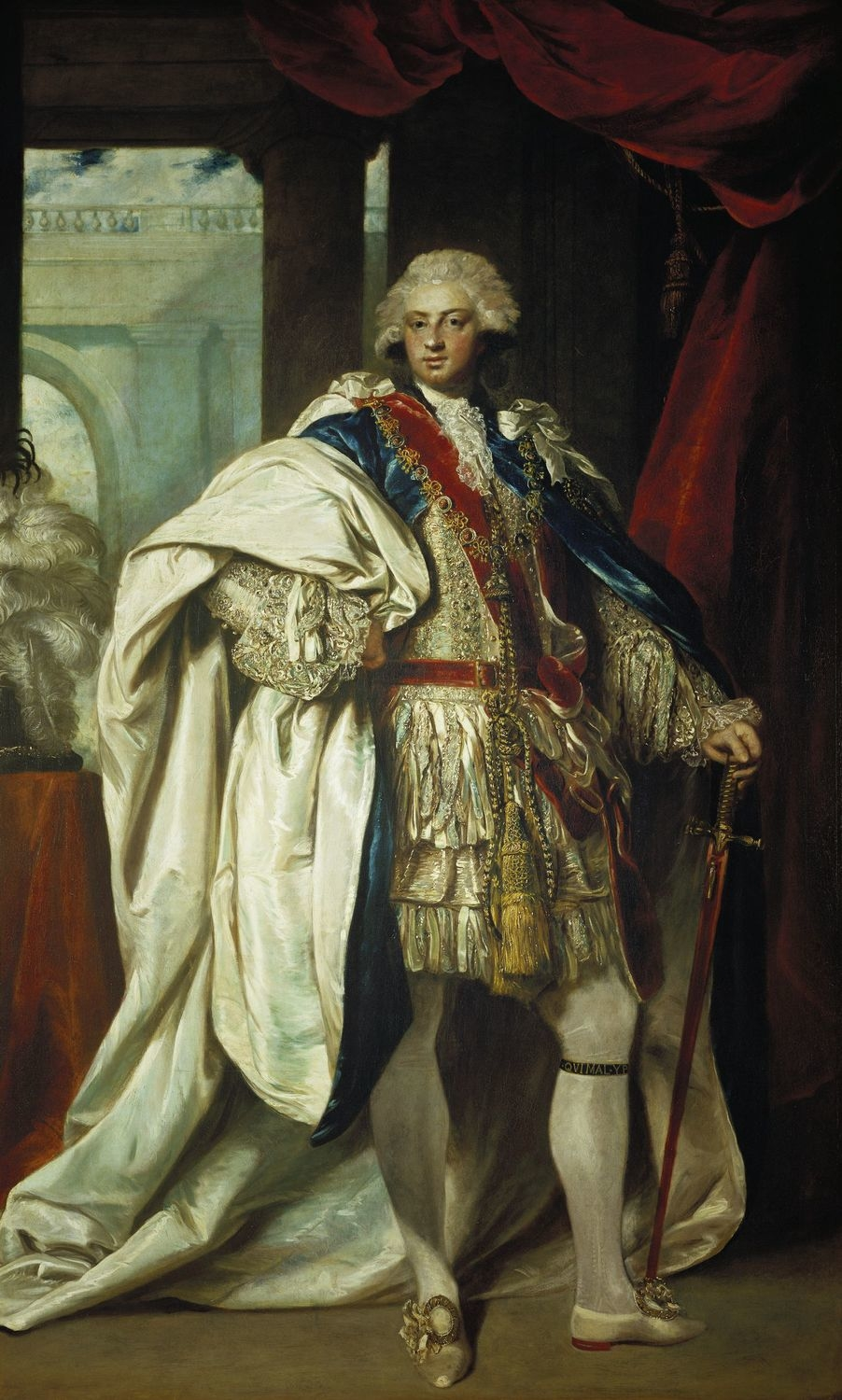
Portrait of Frederick, Duke of York by Joshua Reynolds

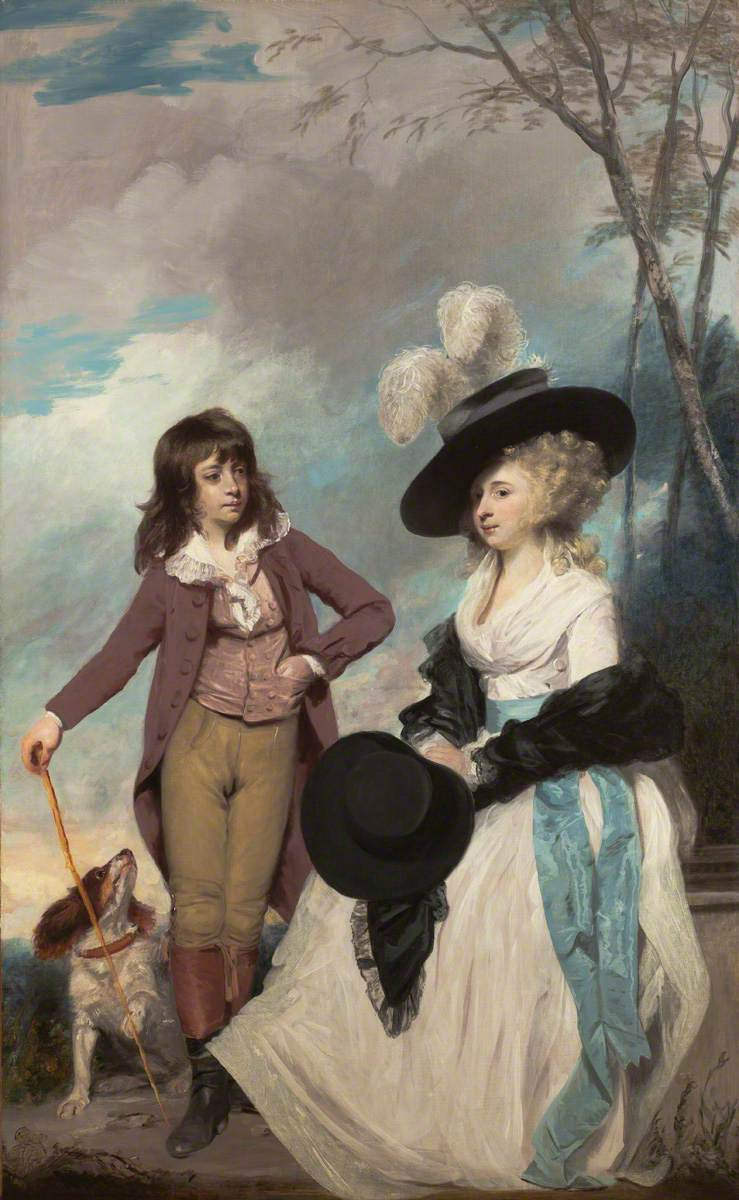
Maria Marow Gideon and Her Brother, William by Joshua Reynolds

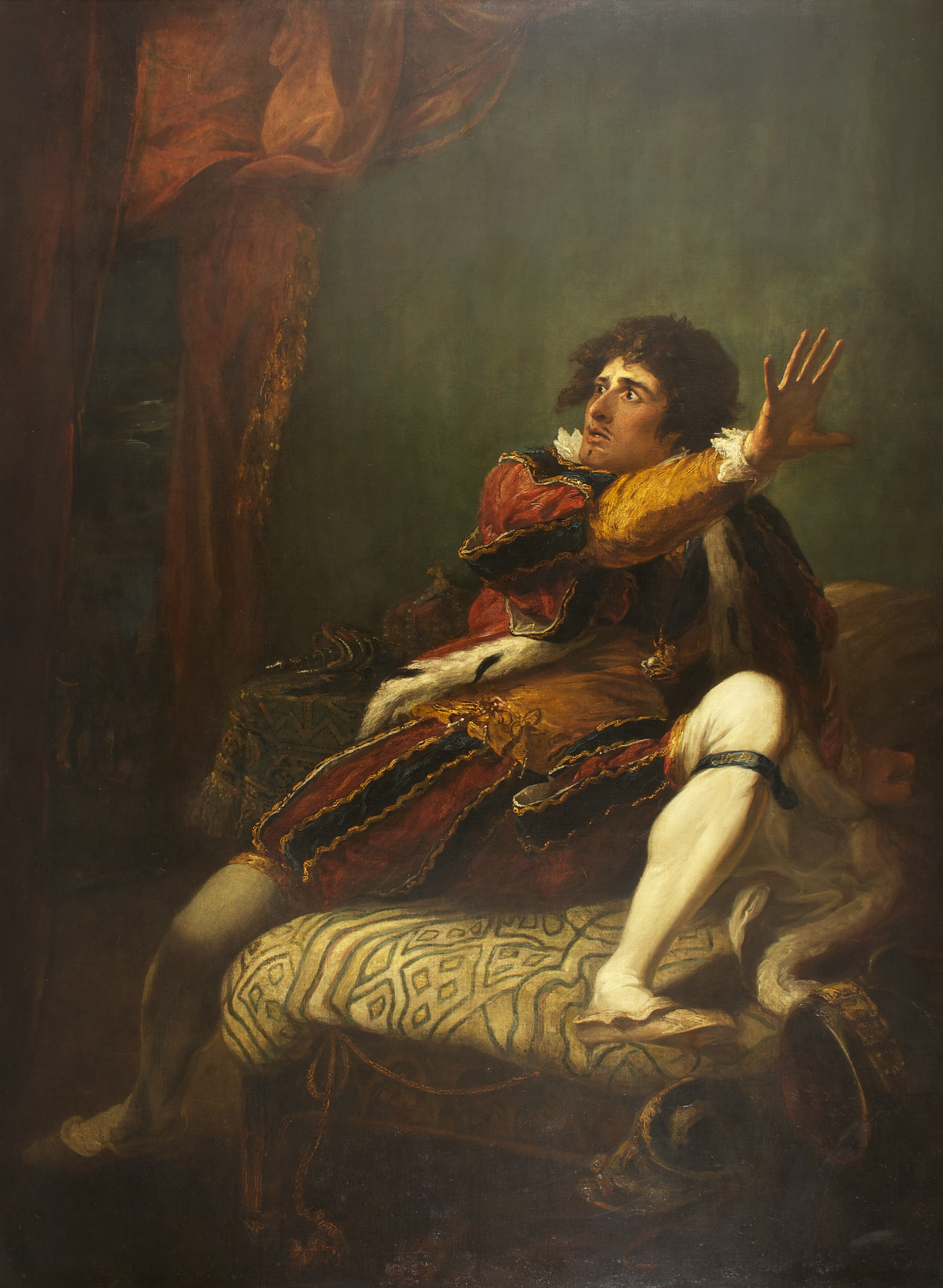
John Philip Kemble as Richard III by William Hamilton

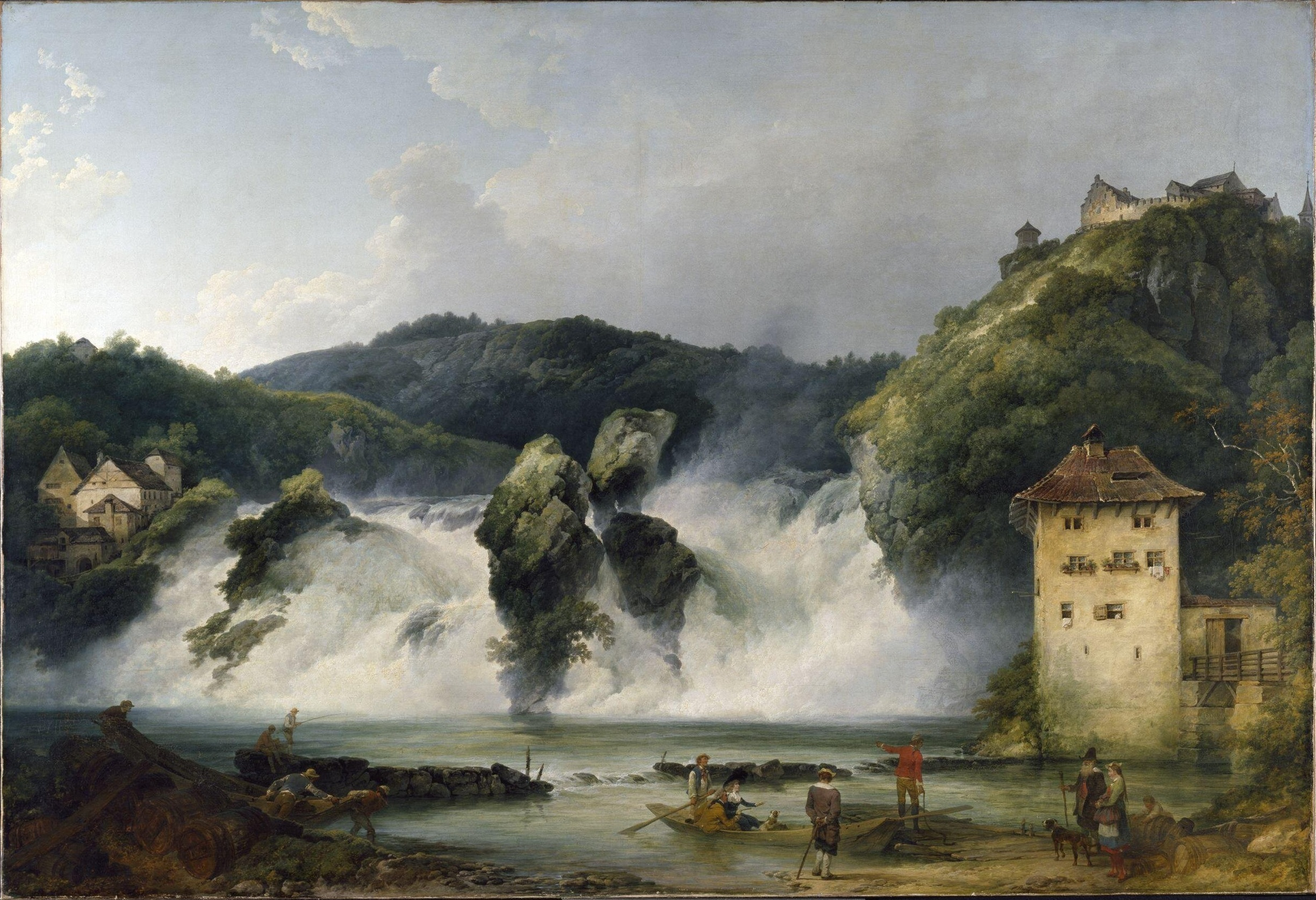
The Falls of the Rhine at Schaffhausen by Philip James de Loutherbourg

Arrival of Their Sicilian Majesties at Naples by Dominic Serres

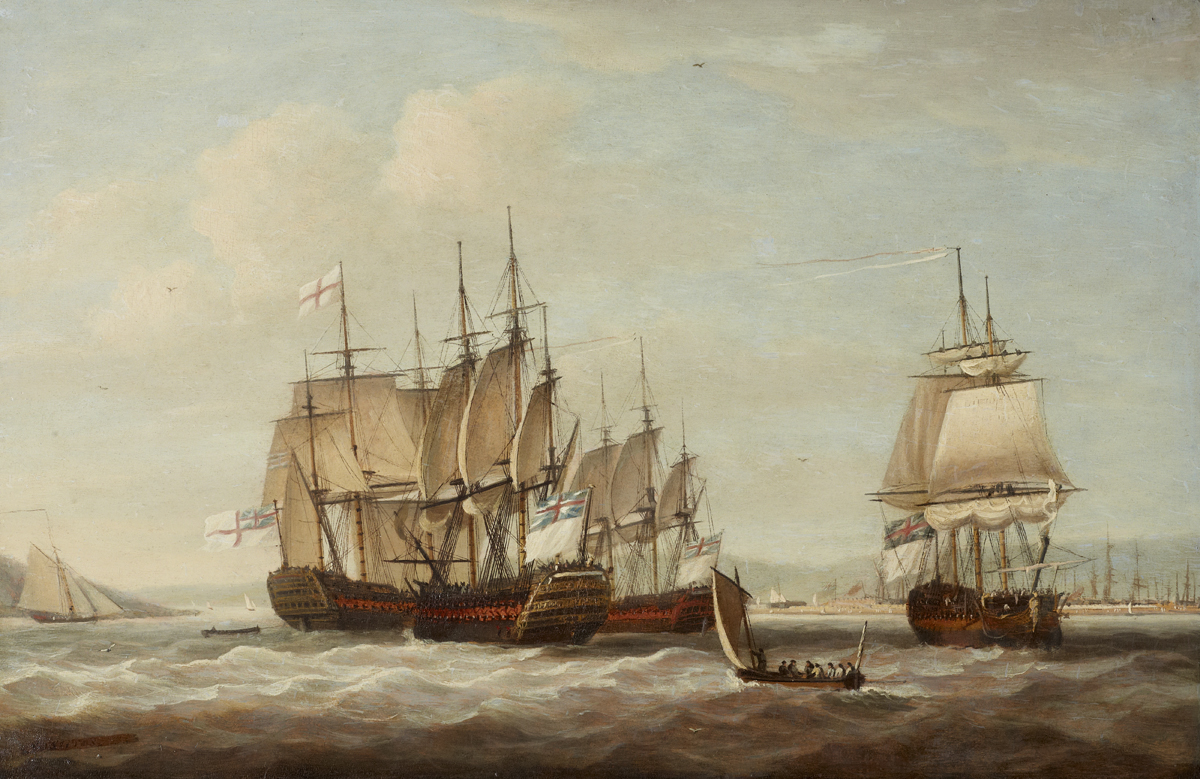
Admiral Rodney Taking Captured French Ships to Jamaica by Dominic Serres

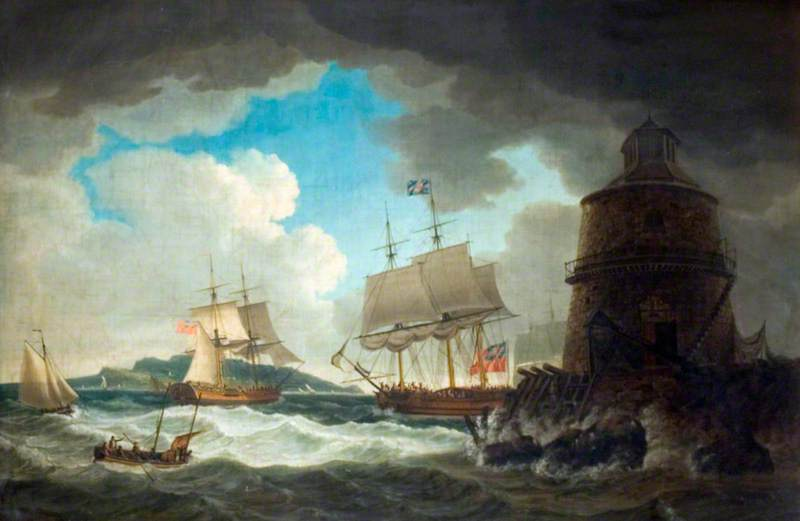
The Lighthouse in the Bay of Dublin, with His Majesty's Yacht Dorset by John Thomas Serres

The Battle of Frigate Bay by Nicholas Pocock

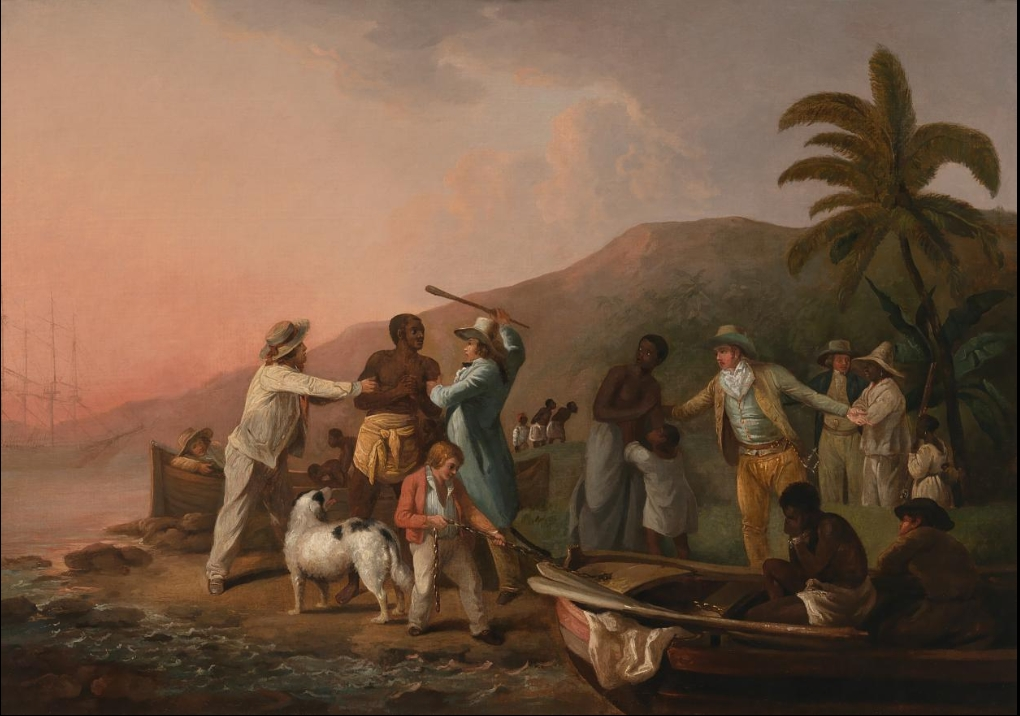
Slave Trade by George Morland

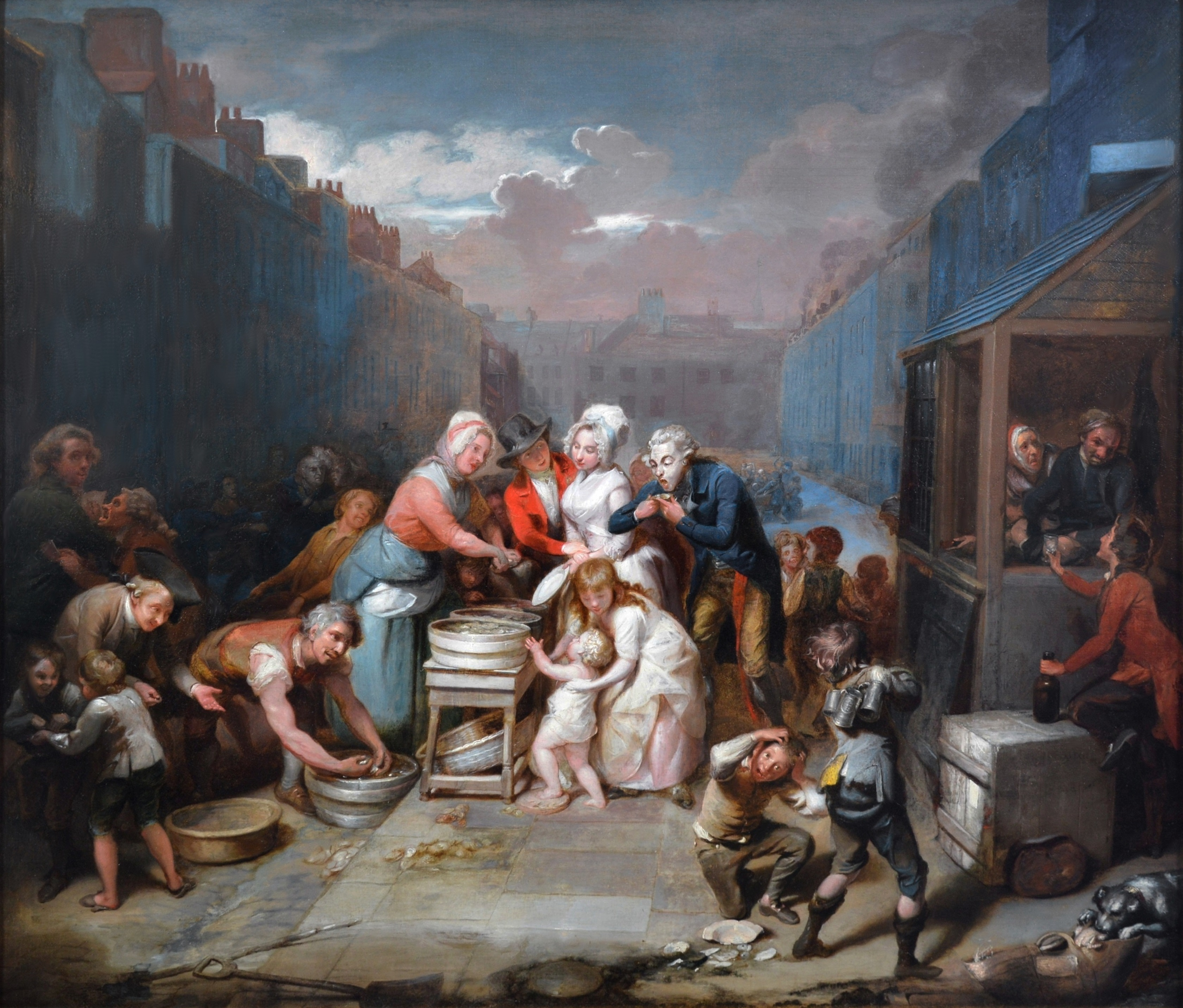
St James' Day by Richard Morton Paye

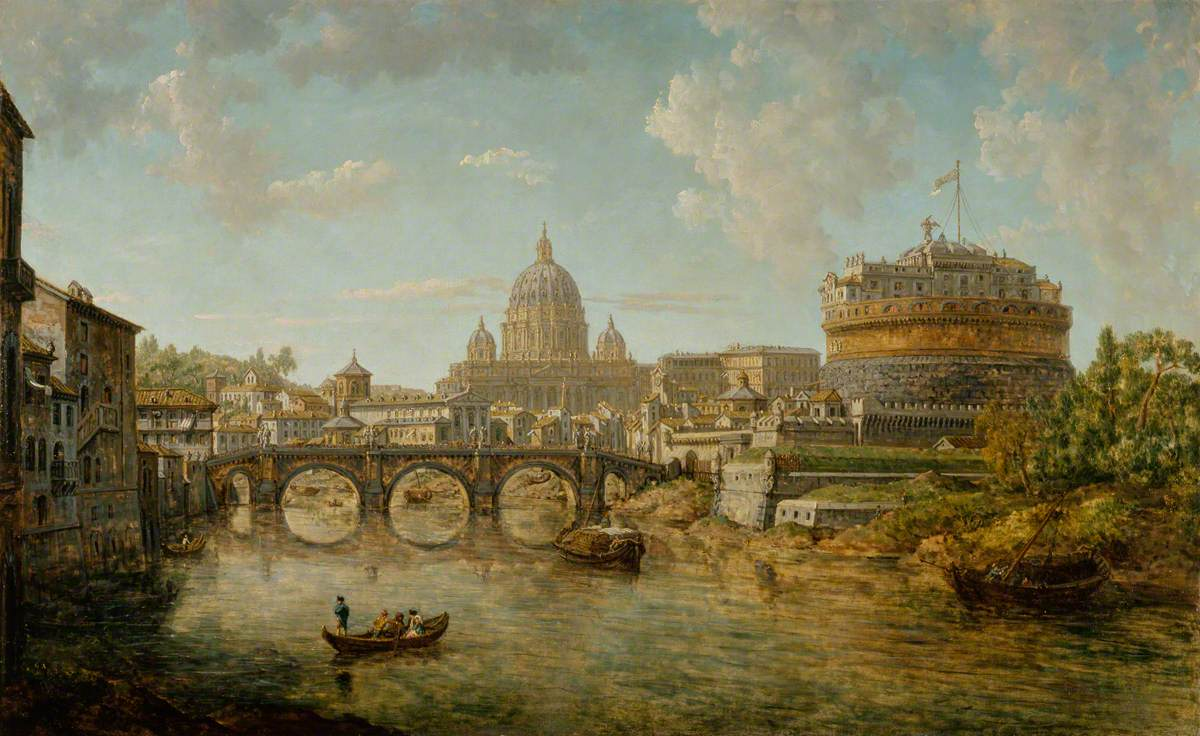
View of St Peter's with Castel Sant' Angelo, Rome by William Marlow

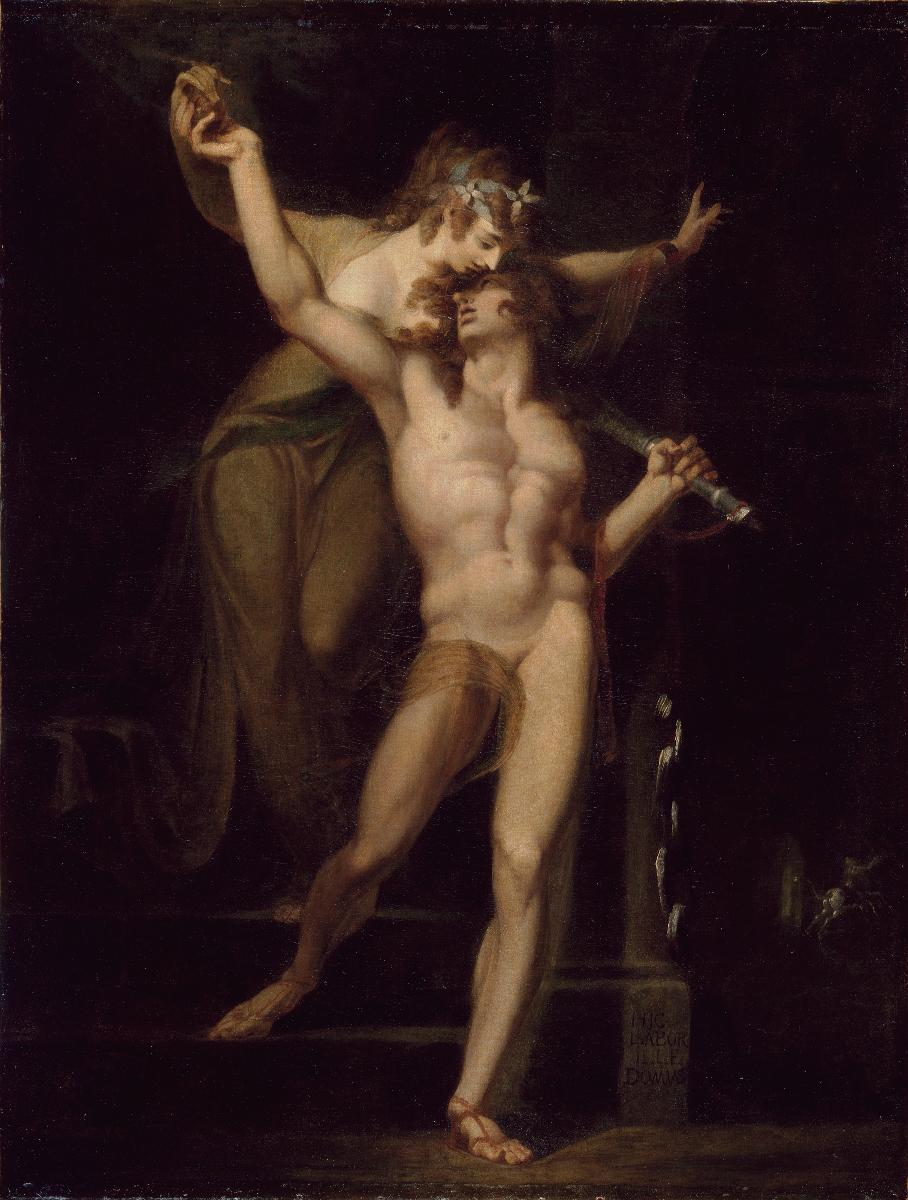
Theseus and Ariadne by Henry Fuseli

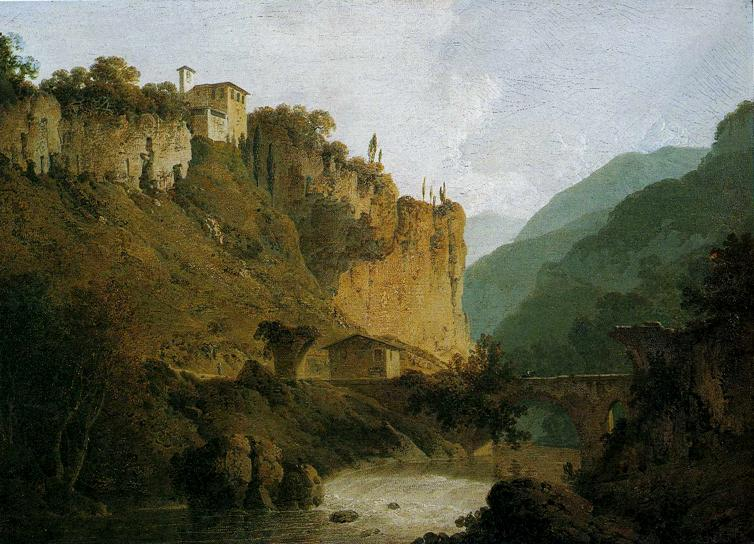
The Convent of San Cosimato by Joseph Wright of Derby

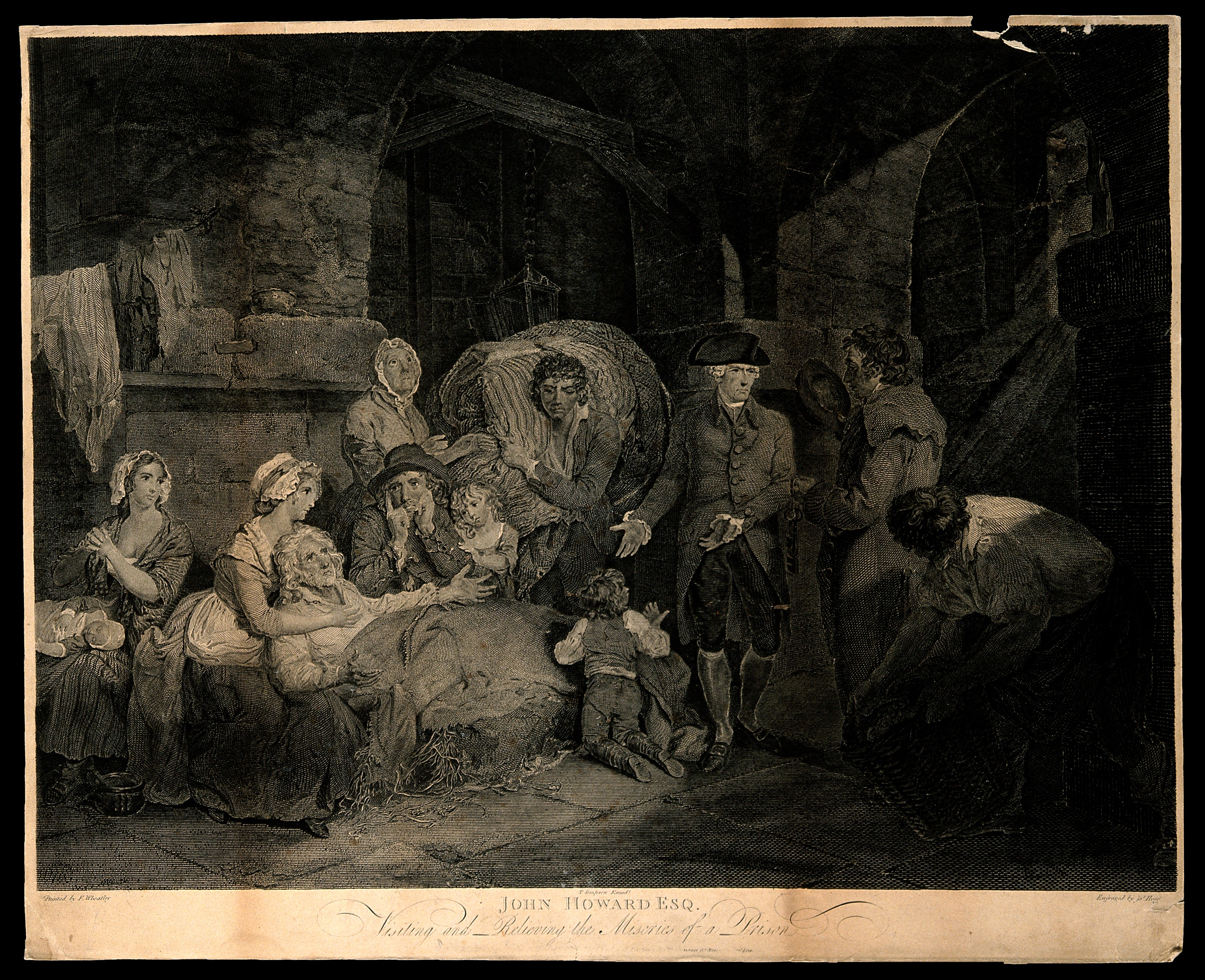
John Howard Visiting a Prison, an engraving based on painting by Francis Wheatley

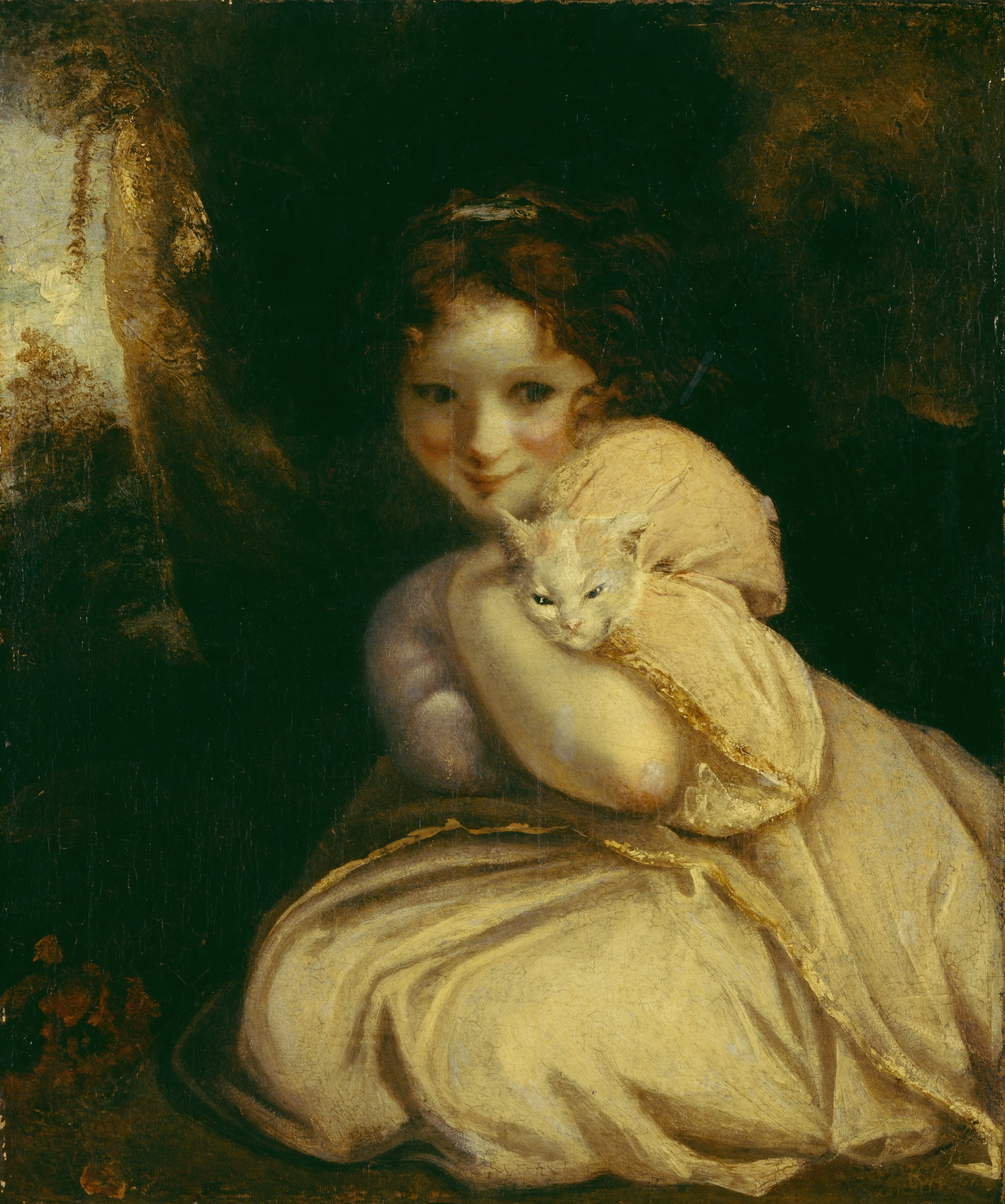
Felina with a Kitten by Joshua Reynolds

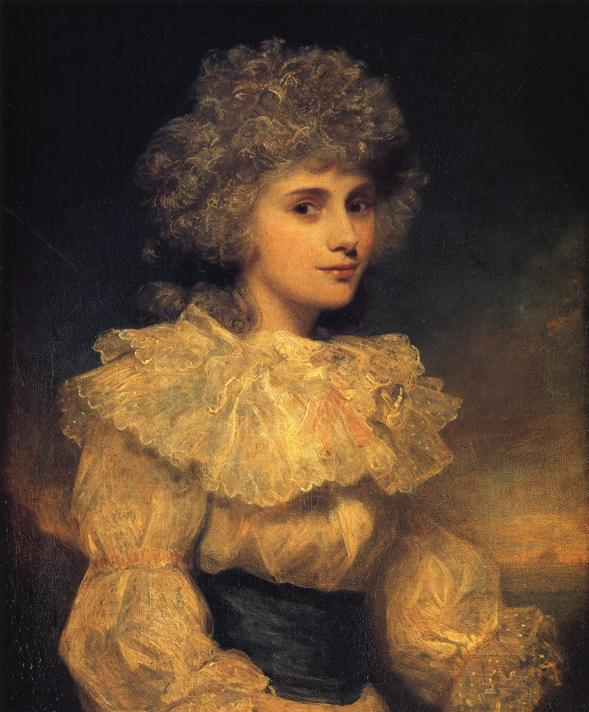
Portrait of Lady Elizabeth Foster by Joshua Reynolds

Portrait of George Catchmaid Morgan by Joshua Reynolds

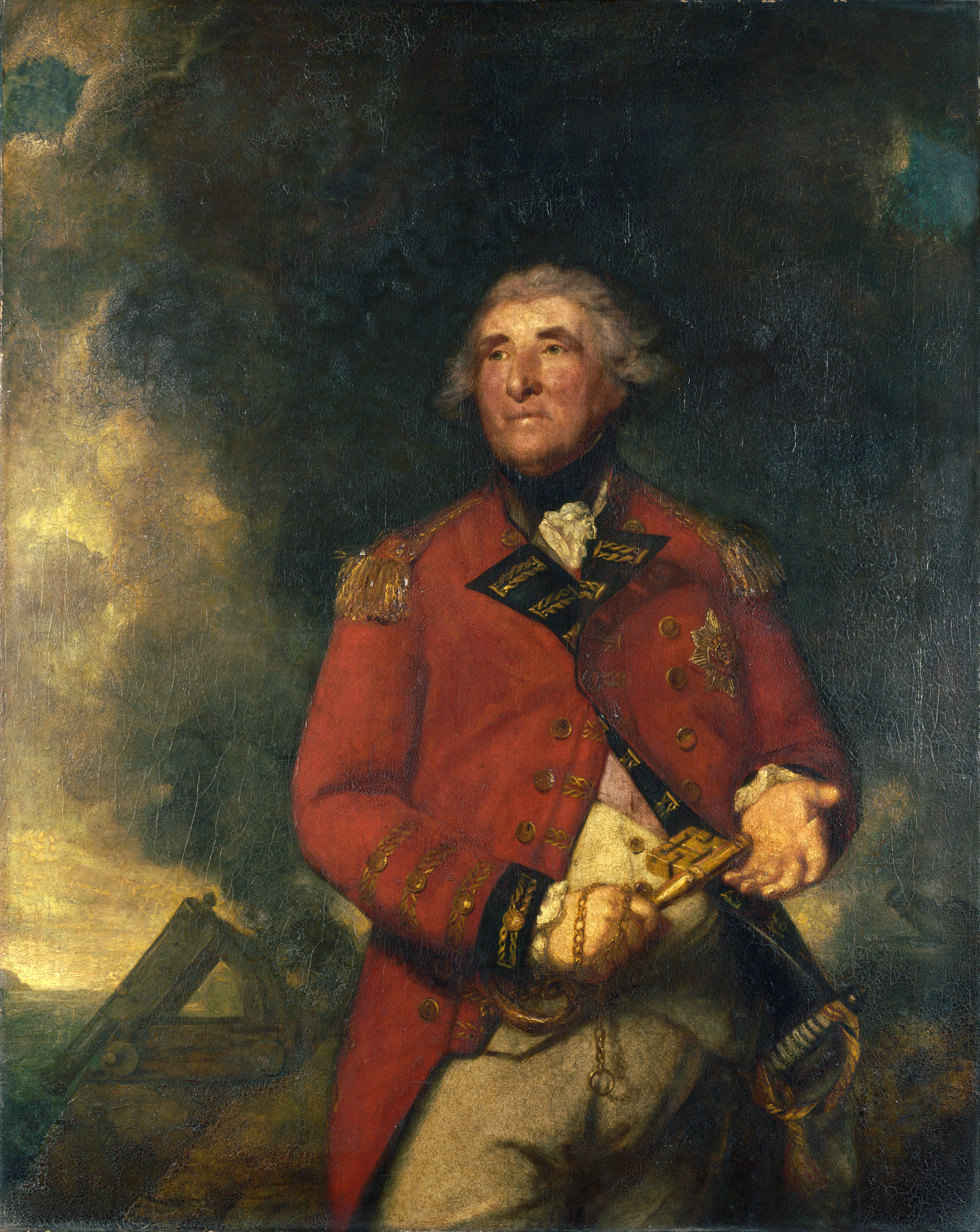
Portrait of Lord Heathfield by Joshua Reynolds

== Bibliography ==
- Alexander, David S. Angelica Kauffman: A Continental Artist in Georgian England. Reaktion Books, 1992.
- Egerton, Judy. George Stubbs, Painter. Yale University Press, 2007.
- Evans, Dorinda. Mather Brown, Early American Artist in England. Wesleyan University Press, 1982.
- Levey, Michael. Sir Thomas Lawrence. Yale University Press, 2005.
- McIntyre, Ian. Joshua Reynolds: The Life and Times of the First President of the Royal Academy. Allen Lane, 2003.
- Wright, Amina. Thomas Lawrence: Coming of Age. Bloomsbury Publishing, 2020.
