= The Ascent of Lunardi's Balloon from St George's Fields =

Painting by Julius Caesar Ibbetson

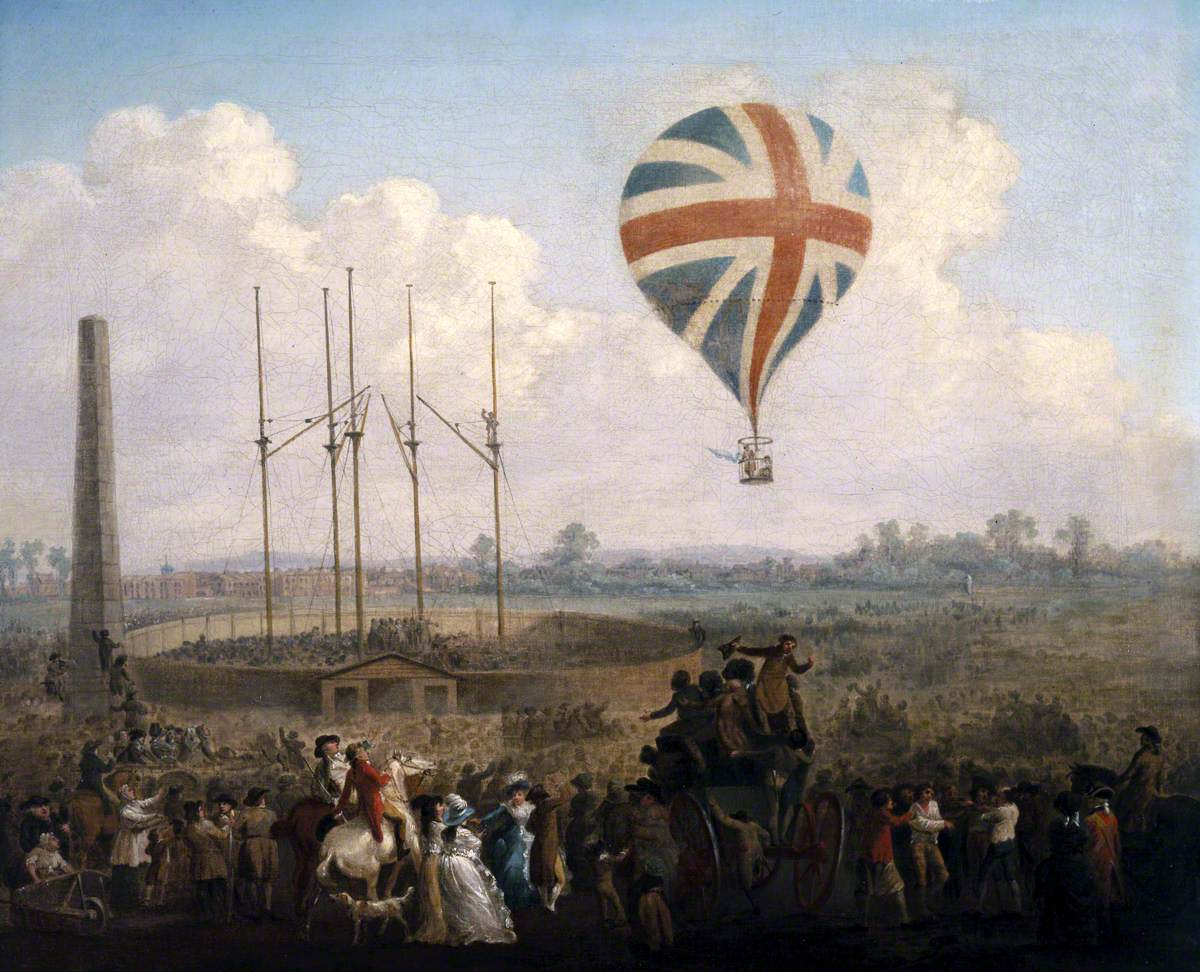
- Artist: Julius Caesar Ibbetson
- Year: c.1788
- Type: Oil on canvas, landscape painting
- Dimensions: 52 cm × 62 cm (20 in × 24 in)
- Location: Science Museum, London

The Ascent of Lunardi's Balloon from St George's Fields is a c.1788 oil painting by the British artist Julius Caesar Ibbetson. A mix of landscape and history painting it depicts the large crowd gathered at St George's Circus in Lambeth to witness the modern technology. Galinou, During the 1780s the possibility of flight using hot air balloons attracted popular interest. The pioneering Aeronaut Vincenzo Lunardi, the secretary to the Neapolitan ambassador to Britain, who has designed his own balloon successfully in 1784. The following year he planned a larger spectacle.

Although Lunardi had planned to pilot the balloon himself and carry four passengers, it struggled to rise with the additional weight. Lunardi deferred to his patron George Biggins, who was accompanied by a single passenger Letitia Ann Sage. Despite his lack of experience, Biggins was able to safely steer the balloon across the Thames to land safely across the Westminster side and beyond. A huge number of tickets were sold to watch the launch.

Ibbetson was a prominent landscape painter of the eighteenth century. The painting was displayed at the Royal Academy Exhibition of 1788 held at Somerset House. Several versions exist, all around 50 cm × 60 cm (20 in × 24 in), with one in the collection of the Neue Pinakothek in Munich, another in the London Museum,, and the largest in the Science Museum, London.

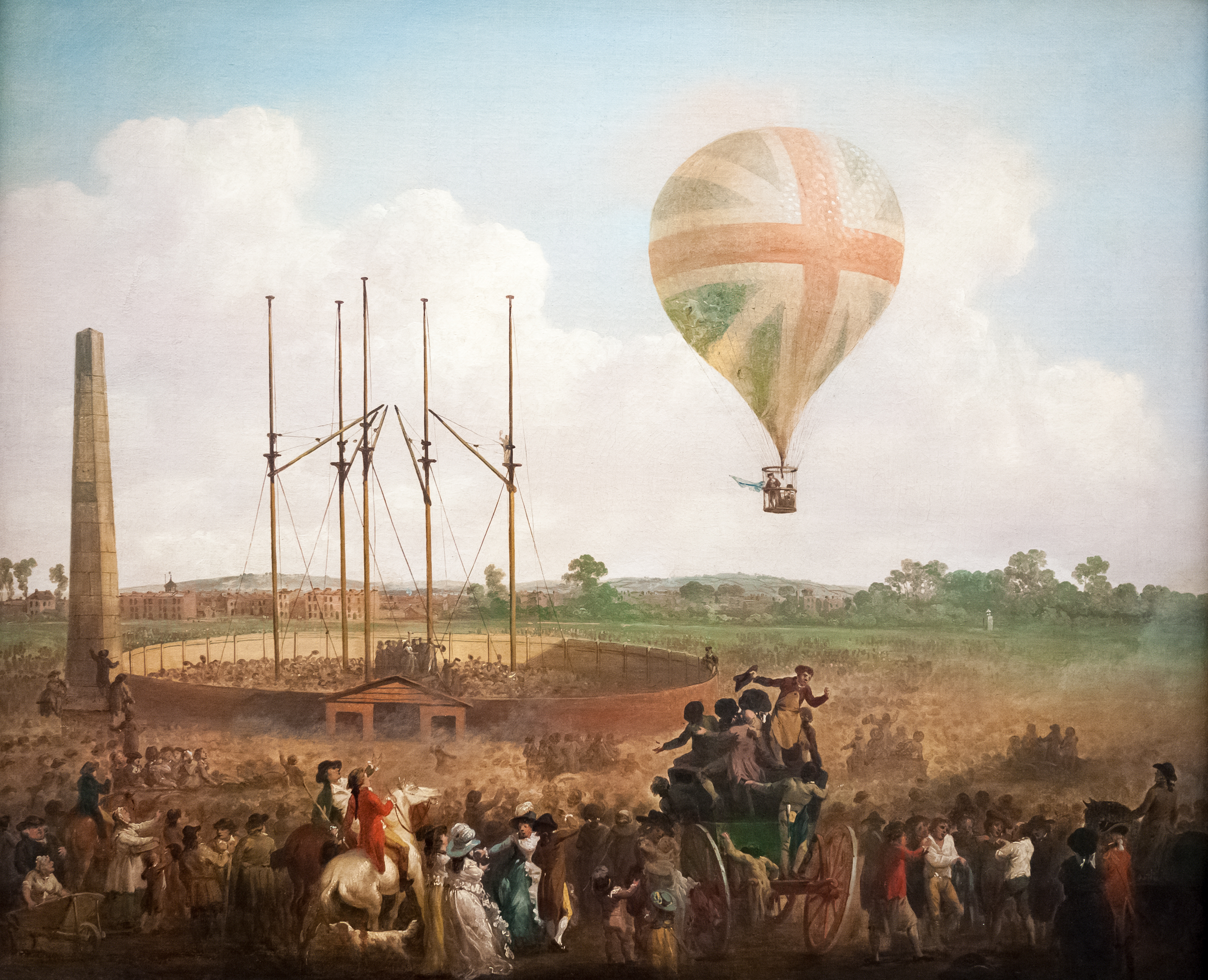
Painting at the Neue Pinakothek

== Bibliography ==
- Clay, Rotha Mary. Julius Caesar Ibbetson, 1759-1817. Country Life, 1948.
- Galinou, Mireille & Hayes, John. London in Paint: Oil Paintings in the Collection at the Museum of London. The Museum, 1996.
