= Portrait of Lord Heathfield =

Painting by Joshua Reynolds

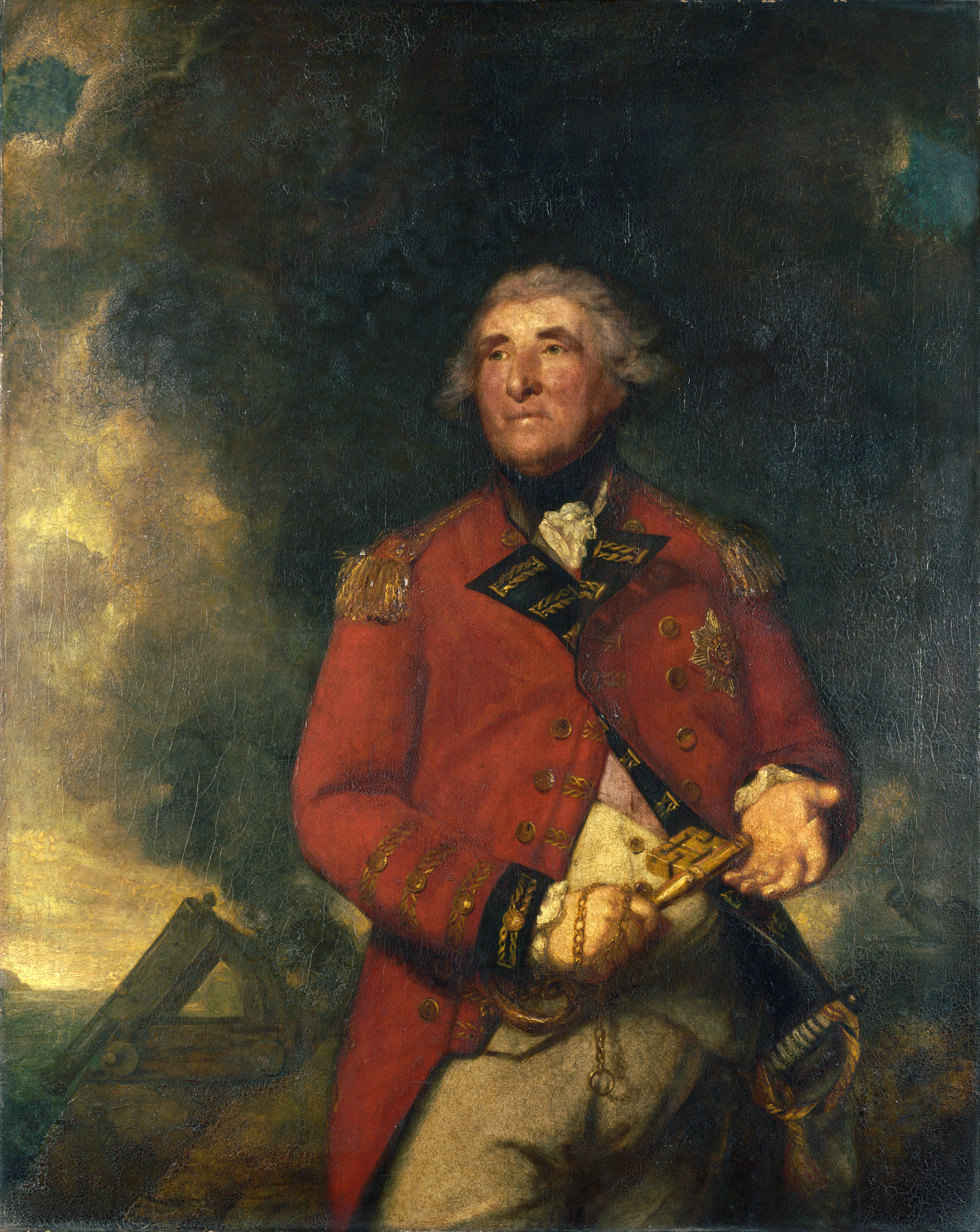
- Artist: Joshua Reynolds
- Year: 1787
- Type: Oil on canvas, portrait painting
- Dimensions: 142 cm × 113.5 cm (56 in × 44.7 in)
- Location: National Gallery, London

Portrait of Lord Heathfield is a 1787 portrait painting by the English artist Sir Joshua Reynolds depicting the Scottish soldier George Augustus Eliott, 1st Baron Heathfield. The garrison under his command had defied much larger Franco-Spanish forces at the lengthy Great Siege of Gibraltar during the American War of Independence. British victory had come with the defeat of the floating batteries and the third and final relief of Gibraltar in October 1782. He had been awarded the title of Baron Heathfield for his service. The painting makes reference to the siege with billowing smoke and the symbolic key to Gibraltar that Heathfield holds in defiance of his enemies.

Reynolds was the first President of the British Royal Academy of Arts, noted for his innovations to portraiture. The painting was displayed at the Royal Academy Exhibition of 1788 at Somerset House in London. The painting was part of the collection of John Julius Angerstein, having previously belonged to Thomas Lawrence. In 1824 it was purchased to form part of the new National Gallery. As was common with Reynolds paintings the texture of the work declined due to the painting materials he had used, giving it a faded appearance.

== Bibliography ==
- Jones, Robert W. Literature, Gender and Politics in Britain During the War for America, 1770-1785. Cambridge University Press, 2011.
- McIntyre, Ian. Joshua Reynolds: The Life and Times of the First President of the Royal Academy. Allen Lane, 2003.
- Postle, Edward (ed.) Joshua Reynolds: The Creation of Celebrity. Harry N. Abrams, 2005.
