= The Falls of the Rhine at Schaffhausen =

Painting by Philip James de Loutherbourg

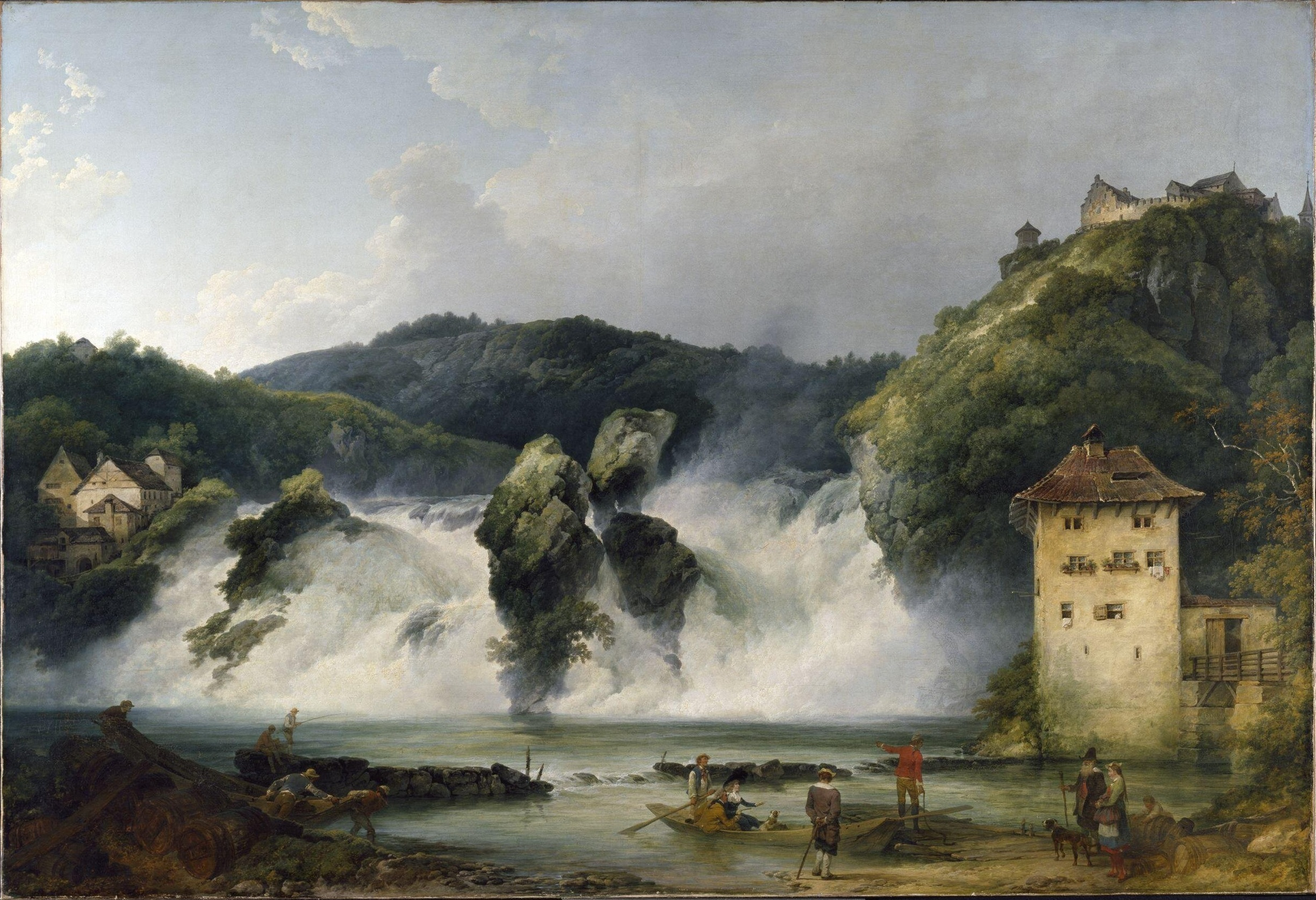
- Artist: Philip James de Loutherbourg
- Year: 1788
- Type: Oil on canvas, landscape painting
- Dimensions: 134.6 cm × 198.1 cm (53.0 in × 78.0 in)
- Location: Victoria and Albert Museum, London

The Falls of the Rhine at Schaffhausen is an oil on canvas landscape painting by the French-born artist Philip James de Loutherbourg, from 1788.

== History and description ==
It shows a scene on the Rhine Falls in Neuhausen am Rheinfall, near Schaffhausen, in Switzerland. Loutherbourg visited the country that year where he produced this work in the emerging style of Romanticism.

After settling in London the artist became known for stage designs for David Garrick at the Theatre Royal, Drury Lane, while also producing landscape paintings. Loutherberg intended this painting as a rejoinder to those who had criticised his landscapes as too full of invention and not being direct studies of nature. It was exhibited at the Royal Academy's Summer Exhibition of 1788 having been shipped from Switzerland.

Today it is the collection of the Victoria and Albert Museum having been acquired in 1886.

== Bibliography ==
- Evans, Mark. The Painted World: From Illumination to Abstraction. Harry N. Abrams, 2005.
- Herbert, Stephen. A History of Pre-cinema, Volume 2. Taylor & Francis, 2000.
- O'Rourke, Stephanie. Art, Science, and the Body in Early Romanticism. Cambridge University Press, 2021.
