= John Wolcot =

English satirist (1738–1819)

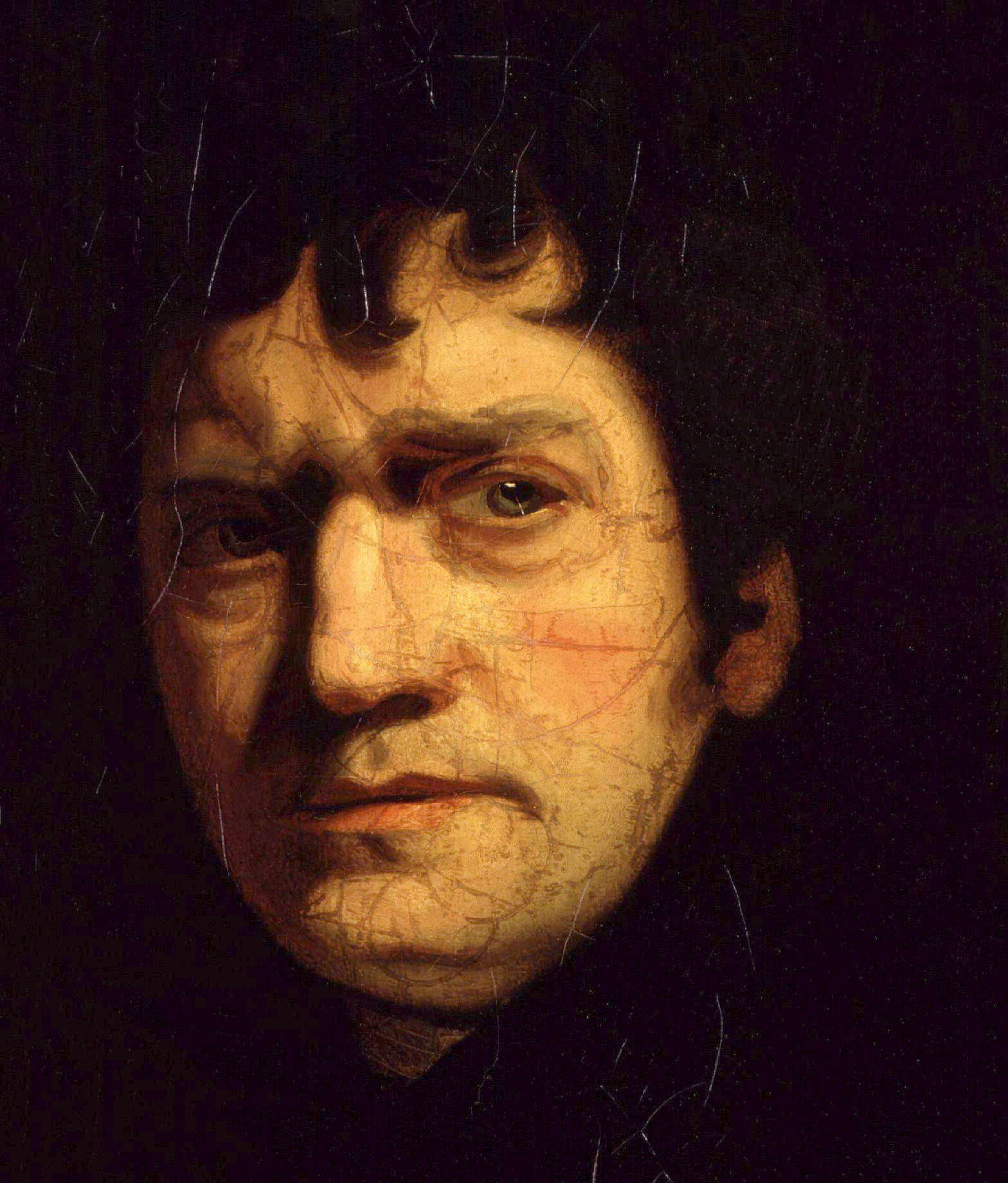
- Portrait of John Wolcot by John Opie, circa 1780 (detail)
- Born: Dodbrooke, near Kingsbridge, Devon, England (baptised)
- Baptised: 9 May 1738
- Died: 14 January 1819 (aged 80); Somers Town, Middlesex, England
- Resting place: St Paul's, Covent Garden
- Other name: Peter Pindar
- Education: Aberdeen University
- Occupations: Physician, Clergyman, Author

John Wolcot (baptised 9 May 1738 – 14 January 1819) was an English satirist, who wrote under the pseudonym of "Peter Pindar". (Note: The pseudonym was also used by C. F. Lawler (fl. 1812–1819), author of The Regent's Bomb (The R----t's bomb! c. 1816) .)

== Life ==
Wolcot was baptised at Dodbrooke, near Kingsbridge, Devon. In the parish register, his surname was spelled "Woolcot". It is not known where he was born. He was educated by an uncle, and received his MD from Aberdeen University. In 1767 he went as physician to Sir William Trelawny, Governor of Jamaica. He was offered the lucrative living of St. Anne's, where the current parson was seriously ill. Wolcott went back to England and took holy orders in 1769. He returned to Jamaica to find the parson of St. Anne's had recovered and Wolcott was instead offered the less lucrative living of Vere. Sir William died in 1772; Wolcot came home and, abandoning the Church, resumed his medical career. He settled in practice at Truro, where he discovered the talents of John Opie, and assisted him.

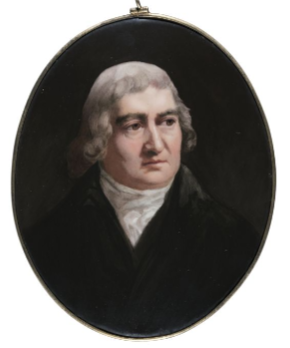
Miniature by Peter Joseph Bone

In 1780 Wolcot went to London and began writing satires. The first objects of his attentions were the members of the Royal Academy. These attempts being well received, he soon began to fly at higher game, the King and Queen being the most frequent marks for his satirical shafts. Between 1785 and 1796 he published The Lousiad: a Heroi-Comic Poem in five cantos, which took its name from a legend that a louse had once appeared on the King's dinner plate. In London Wolcot became an important figure in the art world as patron of both John Opie and later, Richard Morton Paye.

Other objects of his attack were James Boswell, the biographer of Samuel Johnson; James Bruce, the Abyssinian traveller; Hannah More, former bluestocking and playwright and Bishop Porteus. Wolcot had a remarkable vein of humour and wit, which, while intensely comic to persons not involved, stung its subjects to the quick. He had likewise strong intelligence, and a power of coining effective phrases. In other kinds of composition, as in some ballads which he wrote, an unexpected touch of gentleness and even tenderness appears. Among these are The Beggar Man and Lord Gregory.

Wolcot's contemporary, the Irish satirist Henrietta Battier, acknowledged his example and reputation by also writing under the pseudonym "Pindar": her political lampoons appeared under the name "Pat. Pindar".

Much of what Wolcot wrote has now lost all interest owing to the circumstances referred to being forgotten, but enough still retains its peculiar relish to account for his contemporary reputation.

The Austrian composer Joseph Haydn drew on Wolcot's ode To My Candle for his cantata Der Sturm, composed during his visit to London in 1791–1792. In 1811 Wolcot wrote a satirical poem The Carlton House Fete in response to the costly and elaborate Carlton House Fête held to celebrate the beginning of the Regency era.

He died at his home in Latham Place (now part of Churchway), Somers Town, London on 14 January 1819, and was buried in a vault in the churchyard of St Paul's, Covent Garden.

== See also ==
- Pindar, the ancient Greek poet
