= The Burghers of Calais (painting) =

Painting by Benjamin West

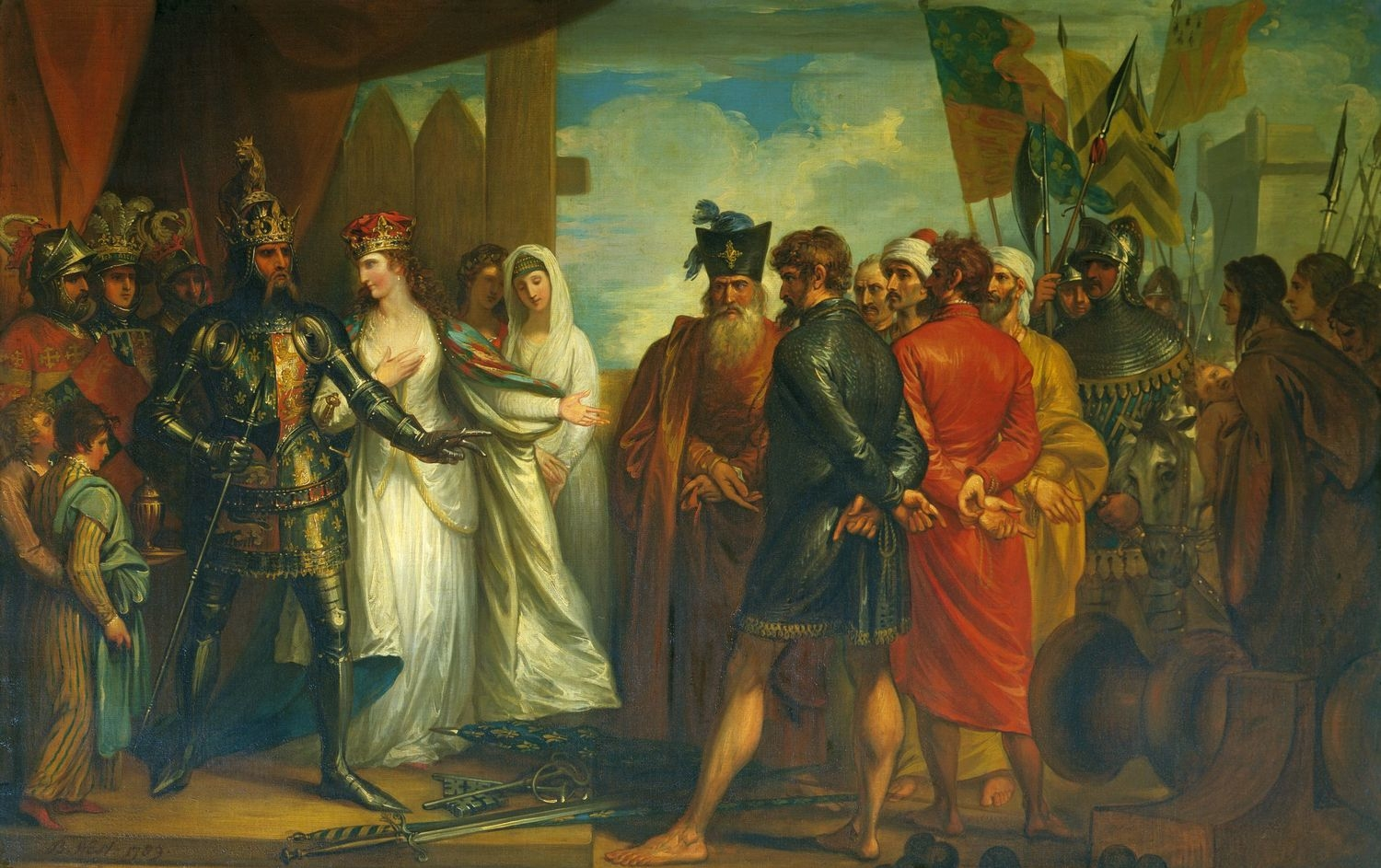
- Artist: Benjamin West
- Year: 1789
- Type: Oil on canvas, history painting
- Dimensions: 100 cm × 153.3 cm (39 in × 60.4 in)
- Location: Royal Collection

The Burghers of Calais is an oil on canvas history painting by the Anglo-American artist Benjamin West, from 1789. It depicts a scene from the Siege of Calais in 1347, part of the Hundred Years War. After his victory at the Battle of Crécy the army of Edward III of England advanced on the port of Calais. After a lengthy siege, he offered terms that if six of the leading citizens would surrender to him and be executed, he would spare the other inhabitants. However, his wife, Philippa of Hainault made a plea for mercy on their behalf and they were also spared. The composition emphasises the dignity of the six burghers and the restrained, eloquent appeal for compassion by Phillipa.

The story was a popular one amongst British history painters with works produced by a variety of artists including Richard Westall, Edward Bird and George Jones. French artist Jean-Simon Berthélemy produced a version of the scene as his diploma work and exhibited it at the Salon of 1777. West received a commission from George III to produce a series of eight paintings for the King's Audience Chamber at Windsor Castle, illustrating scenes from Edward's reign. The painting includes Edward's heir Edward the Black Prince in the group standing behind the king. On the opposite side are members of the English Army. The keys to the city and a captured French banner lay before the monarch. West received 500 guineas for this picture, which remains in the Royal Collection.

== 1788 version ==
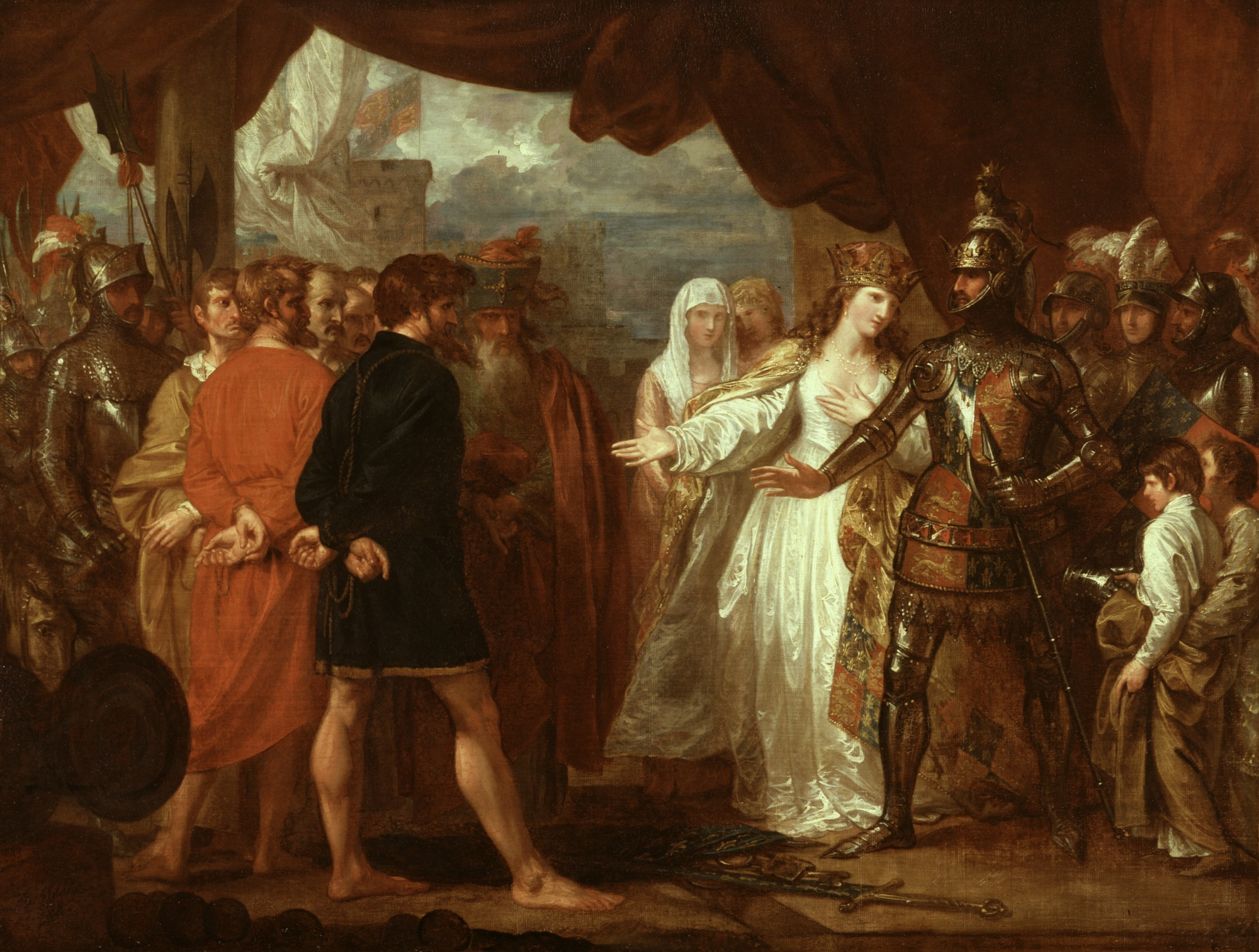
Queen Philippa Interceding for the Lives of the Burghers of Calais by West, 1788

The previous year, West had produced a painting featuring a different composition of the same subject Queen Philippa Interceding for the Lives of the Burghers of Calais, which he displayed at the Royal Academy Exhibition of 1788 at Somerset House in London. It is now in the collection of the Detroit Institute of Arts in Michigan.

== See also ==
- The Burghers of Calais, a sculpture by Auguste Rodin

== Bibliography ==
- Arnold, Dana. Cultural Identities and the Aesthetics of Britishness. Manchester University Press, 2017.
- Corbett, David Peters (ed.). A Companion to British Art: 1600 to the Present. John Wiley & Sons, 2016.
- Lincoln, Andrew. Imagining War and Peace in Eighteenth-Century Britain, 1690–1820. Cambridge University Press, 2023.
