= Francis Wheatley =

Francis Wheatley may refer to:

- Francis Wheatley (painter) (1747–1801), English portrait and landscape painter
- Francis Wheatley (VC) (1821–1865), English soldier and Victoria Cross winner
