= Richard Morton Paye =

English painter

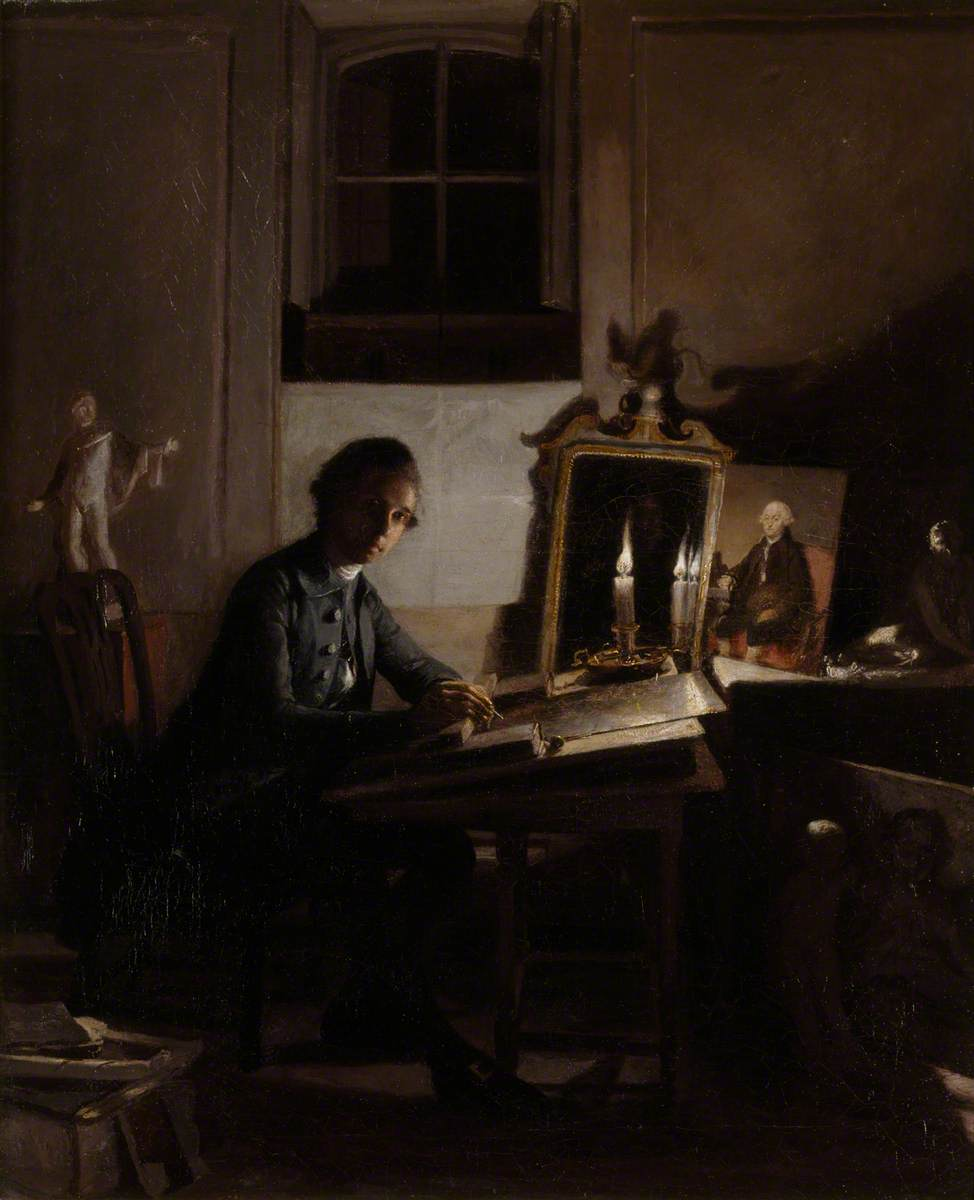
- Richard Morton Paye (1750-c.1821) - Self Portrait of the Artist
- Born: Botley, Hampshire, England
- Died: Clerkenwell, London, England
- Resting place: St James, Clerkenwell
- Known for: Painter, Engraver.
- Patrons: Isaac Taylor (1759–1829); George Townley Stubbs (1748-1815); John Wolcot (1738-1819); Joseph Pott, Archdeacon of London (1759–1847); Joseph Neeld MP (1789–1856); Edward Thurlow, 1st Baron Thurlow, PC, KC (1731-1806); Richard Clark, Lord Mayor of London (1739-1831)

Richard Morton Paye FSA (1750–1820) was an important painter of the early English School and a fellow of the Society of Antiquaries of London. During his lifetime Paye was considered one of the most gifted painters in England but various personal misfortunes befell him and he died virtually penniless and in relative obscurity.

== Early life ==
Richard Morton Paye was the son of John Paye and his wife Elizabeth Morton and was baptised at Botley, Hampshire in 1750. As a young man he worked at chasing.

== Royal Academy ==
Paye's name first appeared at the Royal Academy in 1773 when he had six works accepted for the summer exhibition. Besides two oil paintings, there were four wax models; his style of modelling was compared to George Michael Moser. That year he sold a painting to Joseph Holden Pott. Over the next 30 years he exhibited on 66 occasions at the Royal Academy. In The Library of Fine Arts, published 12 years after Paye's death, it was said that...

"Though placed by the side of those of Sir Joshua Reynolds, Benjamin West, John Hoppner and others of name and note, his performances attracted the notice and approbation of the best judges of the Fine Arts."

Library of the Fine Arts, 1832

Richard Morton Paye also exhibited at the Society of Artists and the British Institution.

== Subjects and style ==
Like William Hogarth, Paye's favourite subject was the ordinary people of London, and in particular its street children, often depicted in a style reminiscent of Bartolomé Esteban Murillo. Recent studies of Paye's work have shown that his methods and use of colour were highly innovative. He was also a perfectionist and the time he spent on his paintings led one of his patrons, the satirist John Wolcot, to predict that he would "paint himself into a gaol". Paye had little business acumen and was described as having suffered from "the calamities and disappointments of genius".

"In his easel pictures Paye's style was careful without being elaborate, and his chiaroscuro was at all times considered of the highest quality: in effect, as well as in character of execution, there was something of the Flemish, but nature in all was the criterion of his excellence."

Library of the Fine Arts, 1832

== Personal setbacks ==
Paye's relationship with his principal patron Wolcot eventually broke down: Wolcot did not take kindly to being caricatured himself. When Paye exhibited his "Portrait of a Sulky Boy" at the Royal Academy in 1785 Wolcot suspected the model was his illegitimate son. When Paye published a comic image of Wolcot himself, depicted as a bear standing in front of an easel, he withdrew his patronage.

"An elusive artist of distinguished quality."

Ellis Waterhouse, 'The Dictionary of British 18th Century Painters

Paye's misfortune was compounded when he suffered a stroke and consequently lost the use of his right arm. He set about relearning how to paint with his left hand only. He continued to have paintings accepted at major London exhibitions. Eventually, though, he descended into near poverty. Financial assistance was found for Paye from the Artists' Benevolent Fund. According to his obituary, his passion and talent remained undimmed and "the love of Art sustained him through all; neither privations nor disappointment could check the ardour of his enthusiasm, nor could sickness in its most appalling shape quench the powers of genius."

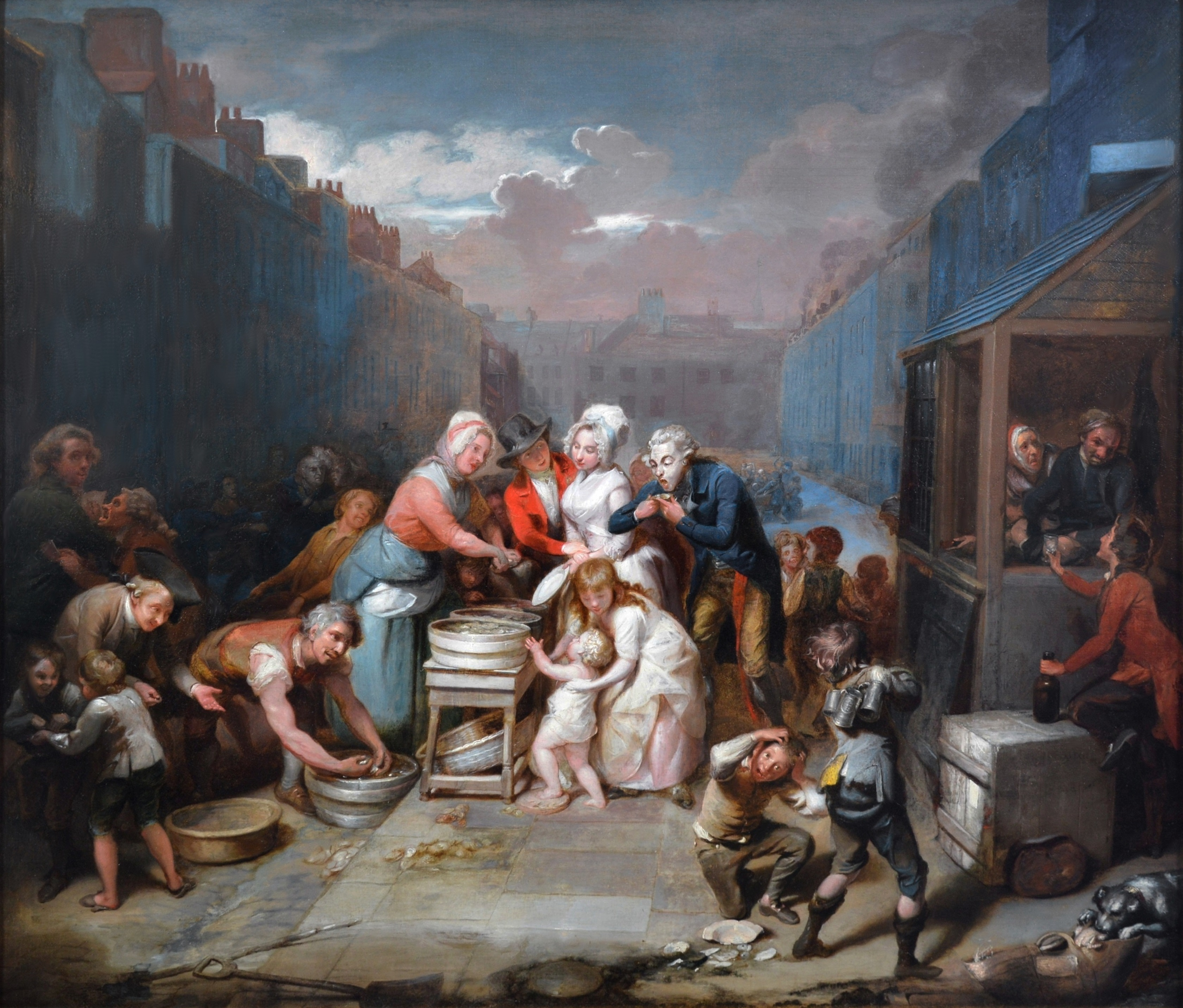
'St James' Day' by Richard Morton Paye. Exhibited at the Royal Academy in 1788.

== Relationship with dealers and critics ==
On several occasion during his lifetime Paye's paintings, which he often left unsigned, were attributed to other artists and sold as being by Diego Velázquez, Thomas Gainsborough, John Hoppner and Joseph Wright of Derby. As a consequence Paye felt he had never received the proper credit from dealers and critics. Paye's masterpiece "St. James' Day", exhibited at the Royal Academy in 1788, depicts a diverse crowd of Londoners at an oyster stand on a summer night. To the lower right a vicious dog is pictured stealing a chicken and written on its collar is the word "critick".

== Final years ==
Paye exhibited his final painting at the British Institution in 1815. Entitled 'The Gout; or a Lecture on Patience' it was hung with the following notice; 'Painted with the left hand, after losing the use of the right by a paralytic fit.' Whilst Richard Morton Paye's career went into decline his daughter Eliza enjoyed a successful career as an artist exhibiting at the Royal Academy on 32 occasions whilst his son, Richard Morton Paye Jnr. built a career as an engraver. Richard Morton Paye died "if not in absolute want, yet most certainly in entire neglect" and was buried at the church of St. James, Clerkenwell on 9th April 1820.

"An unfortunate genius."

Bryan's Dictionary of Painters and Engravers, 1849

== Gallery ==
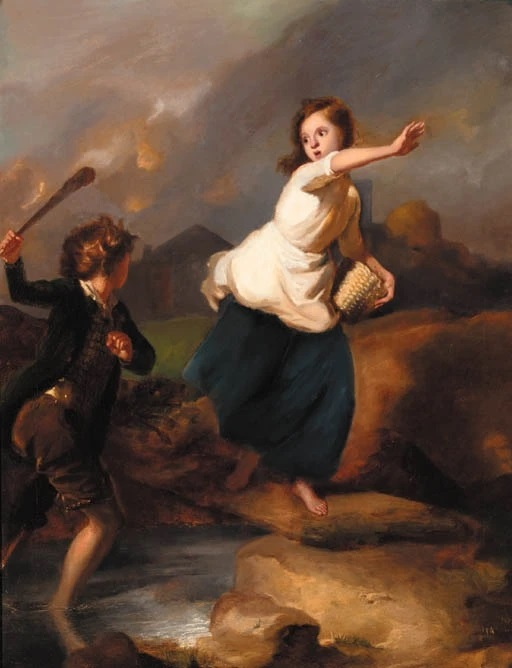
'The Young Assassin' by Richard Morton Paye

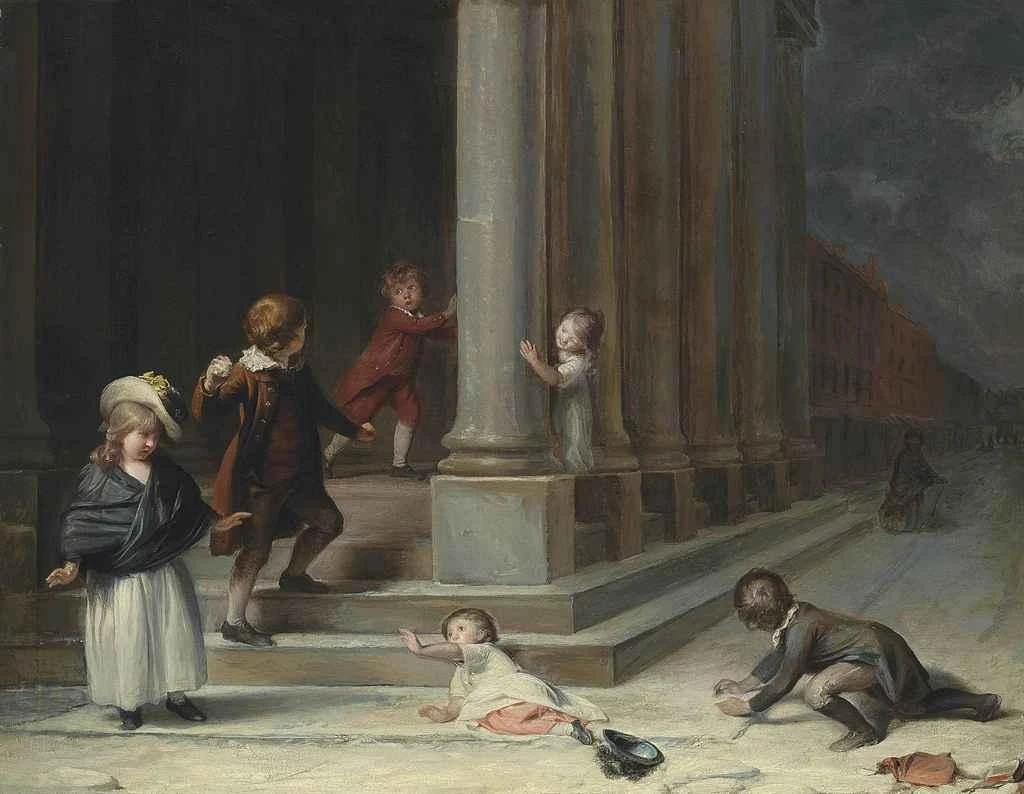
'Boys Throwing Snowballs' by Richard Morton Paye. Exhibited at the Royal Academy in 1784.

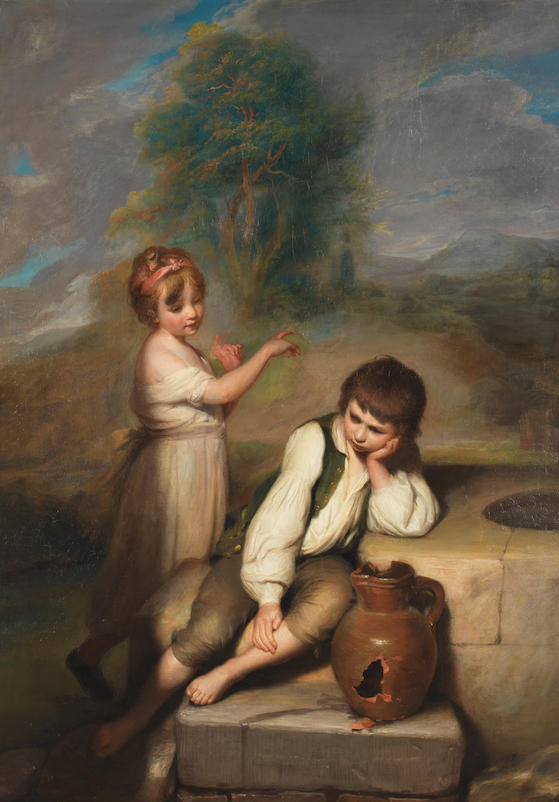
'A Sulky Boy' by Richard Morton Paye

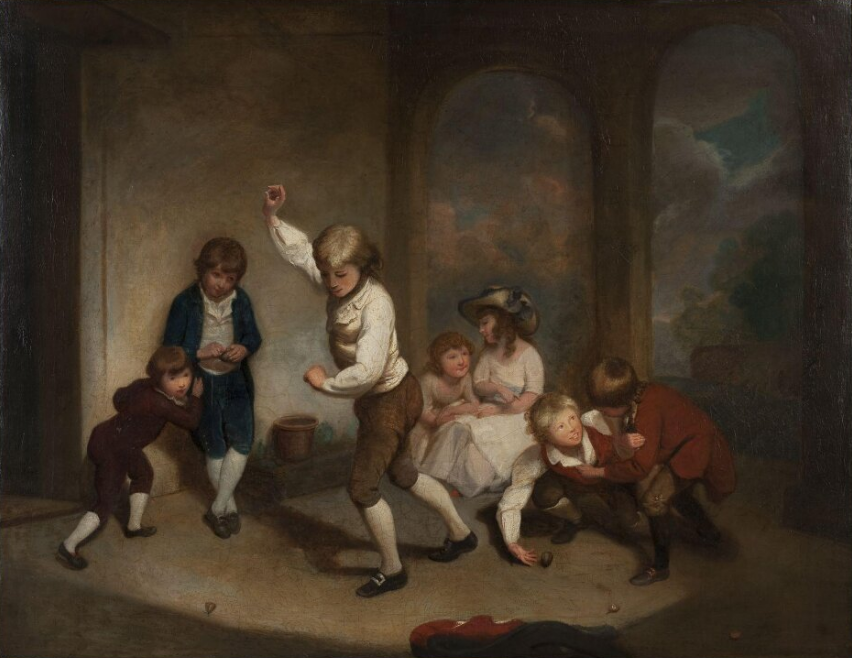
'Children Playing Peg Top' by Richard Morton Paye
