= Julius Caesar Ibbetson =

British painter (1759–1817)

Julius C. Ibbetson
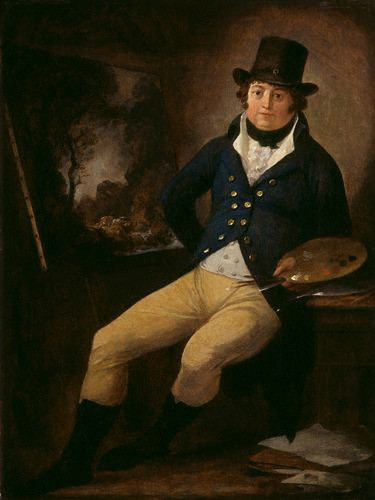
- Selfportrait of Julius Caesar Ibbetson, 1804
- Born: 29 December 1759
- Died: 13 October 1817 (aged 57)

Julius Caesar Ibbetson (29 December 1759 – 13 October 1817) was a British 18th-century landscape and watercolour painter.

== Early life and education ==
Ibbetson was born at Farnley Moor, Leeds. He was the second child of Richard Ibbetson, a clothier from Yorkshire. According to his Memoir, his mother fell on the ice and went into premature labour, causing him to be delivered by caesarean section and resulting in a middle name he attempted to hide throughout his life. Ibbetson was probably educated at a local Moravian community and then by Quakers in Leeds. According to James Mitchell in the Oxford Dictionary of National Biography, the "unusual thoroughness" of his education "is reflected in the fluent prose, both of his published painting manuals and of his regular, often entertaining, and rewarding correspondence with patrons". Ibbetson was apprenticed to John Fletcher, a ship painter in Hull, from 1772 to 1777. He then moved to London, where for the next ten years he was primarily a picture restorer for a Clarke of Leicester Fields. In 1782 wrote an account of his life, and sent it to the artist Benjamin West which was transcribed by Joseph Farington in 1805. Around 1780, Ibbetson married his first wife, Elizabeth.

== Exhibitions and career ==
=== Early work ===
In 1785, Ibbetson began exhibiting at the Royal Academy with View of North Fleet. Mitchell calls George Biggin (1783), which is one of his earliest known works, "an accomplished full-length portrait in the Gainsborough tradition, [which] should be considered as a milestone in the development of an artist who was entirely self-taught". Through the efforts of Captain William Baillie in 1787, Ibbetson was made draughtsman to Colonel Charles Cathcart on the first British embassy to Peking (Beijing); he made many watercolor drawings of the animals and plants on the journey. While he was away, his Ascent of George Biggin, esq. from St. George's Fields, June 29th 1785 was exhibited at the Royal Academy to great critical and popular acclaim. The painting depicted the ascent of a balloon, designed by Vincenzo Lunardi, from St George's Fields in London.

=== Later work ===
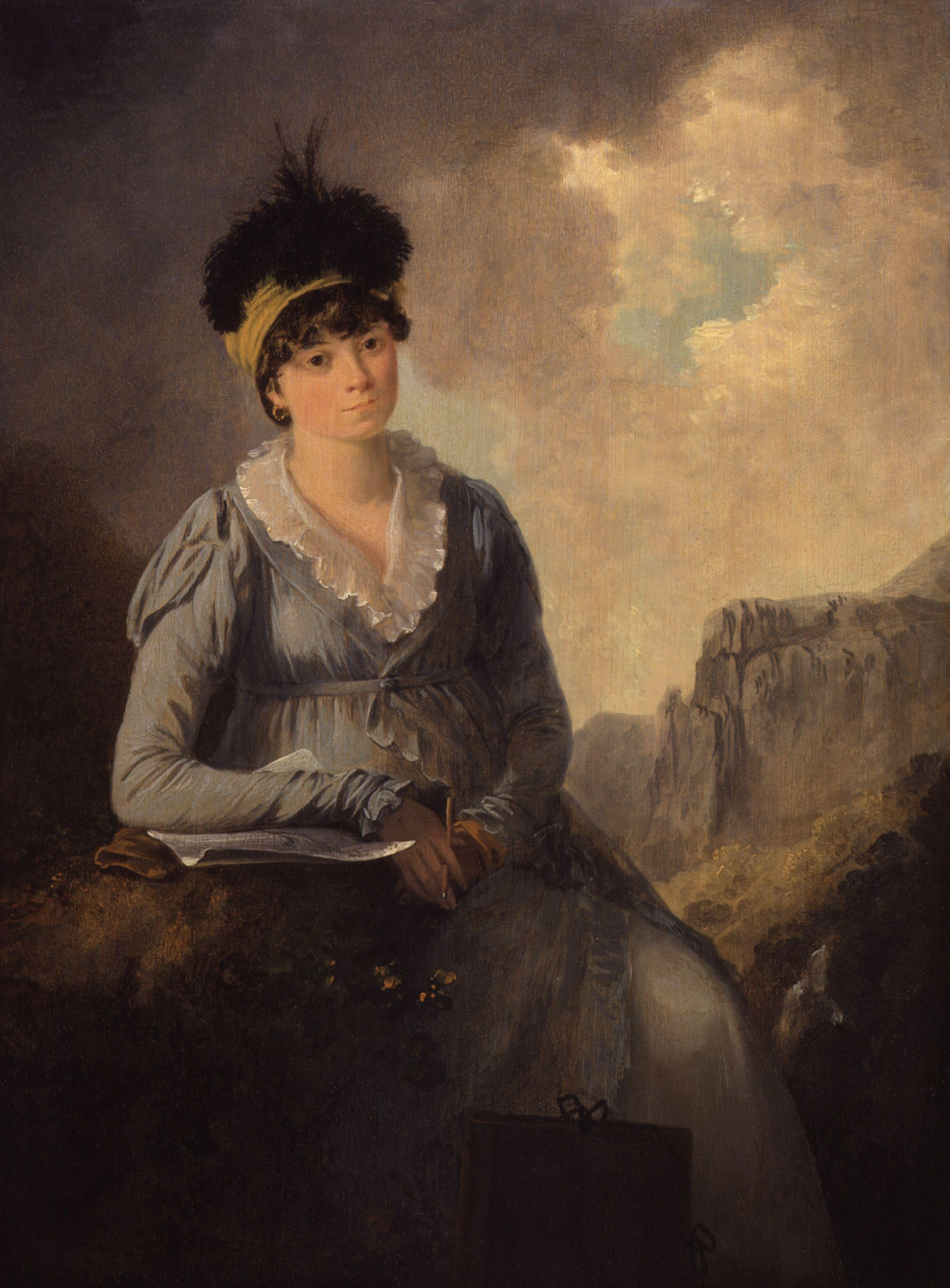
An 1803 portrait of Ibbetson's second wife, Bella, by Ibbetson himself

In 1789, Ibbetson visited the Viscount Mountstuart at Cardiff Castle in Wales. He spent decades drawing the scenery there and, according to Mitchell, "[h]is detailed watercolours of iron furnaces, coal staithes, and copper mines foreshadow the work of Joseph Wright of Derby and J. M. W. Turner and constitute an important record of the early industrial developments in that region, but are less well known than his more numerous scenes of folk life and picturesque scenery." After a visit to the Isle of Wight in 1790, he began painting shipwrecks and smugglers. David Murray, 2nd Earl of Mansfield, and his wife commissioned Ibbetson to decorate Kenwood House, in 1794. This distracted him from the death of his wife and caring for their three children. Her death had "provoked a minor nervous breakdown, exacerbated by near destitution", but the Kenwood project relieved that stress. Four years later, he moved to Liverpool to work for Thomas Vernon. In 1801 he married his second wife, Bella Thompson in Grasmere, Westmorland. They settled in Ambleside and became friendly with the Lake Poets including William Wordsworth and Samuel Taylor Coleridge who became godfather to their daughter Caroline Bella Ibbetson. There are paintings by Ibbetson at Dove Cottage, Grasmere.

Ibbetson acquired several generous patrons in Liverpool and in Edinburgh: William Roscoe, Sir Henry Nelthorpe, and the Countess of Balcarres. The last prompted him to write and publish his instruction manual An Accidence, or Gamut, of Painting in Oil (1803). In 1803, he met the Yorkshire philanthropist William Danby and in 1805 moved to Masham to be near him. The next 14 years of his life were the most settled of his life.

== Death and legacy ==
Ibbetson died on 13 October 1817 and was buried in the churchyard of St Mary's, Masham.

Benjamin West described Ibbetson as the "Berchem of England" in recognition of his debt to the Dutch 17th century landscape painters. According to Mitchell, "[h]is watercolours are prized for their delicacy and sureness of line." Many were engraved for projects such as John Church's A Cabinet of Quadrupeds and John Boydell's Shakespeare Gallery. Samuel Haslem Scott described him as "a portly, jovial person."

== Selected gallery ==
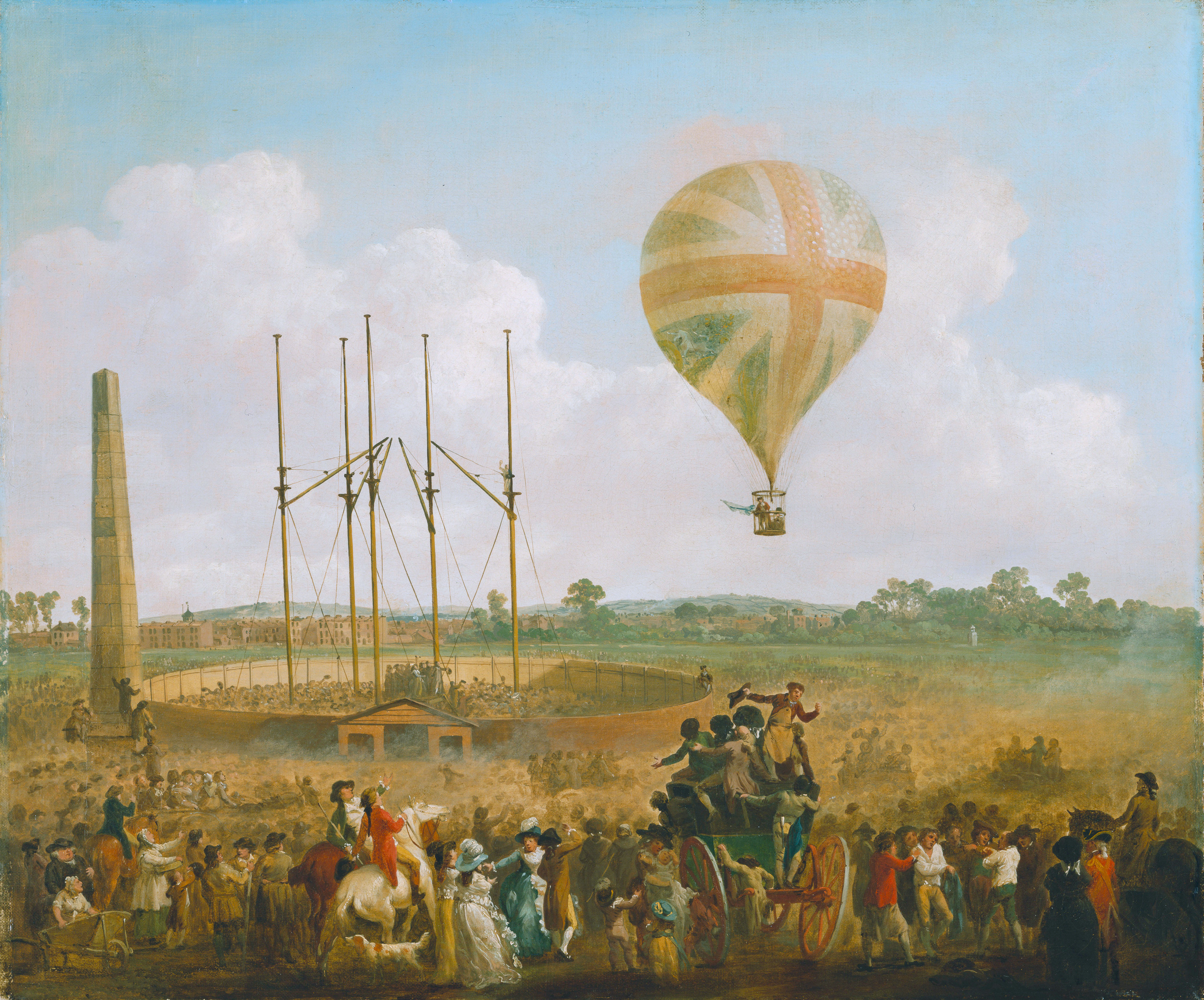
George Biggins' Ascent in Lunardi' Balloon (1785), Neue Pinakothek

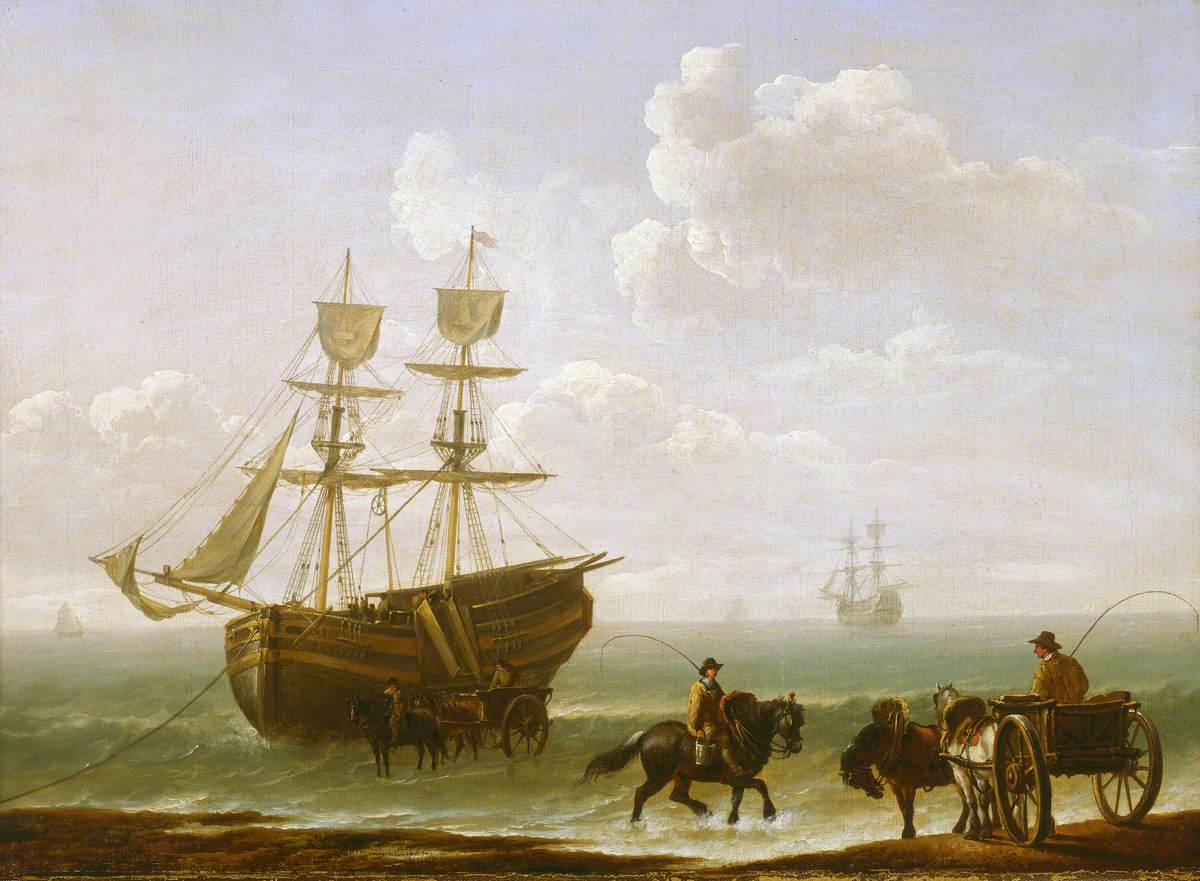
A beached collier unloading into carts (1790), Royal Museums Greenwich

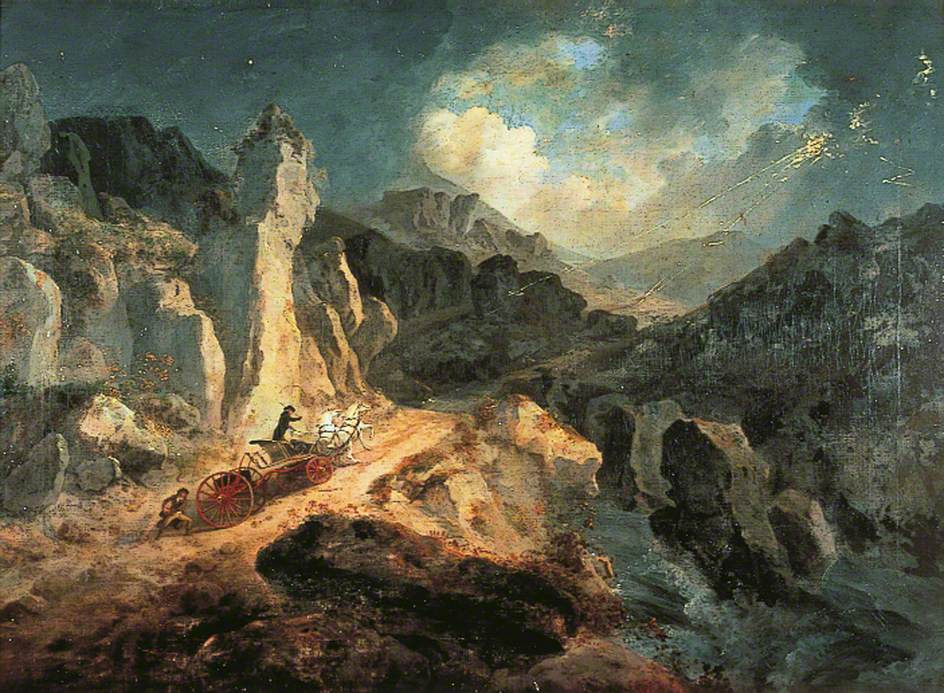
Phaëton in a Thunderstorm (1798), Leeds Art Gallery

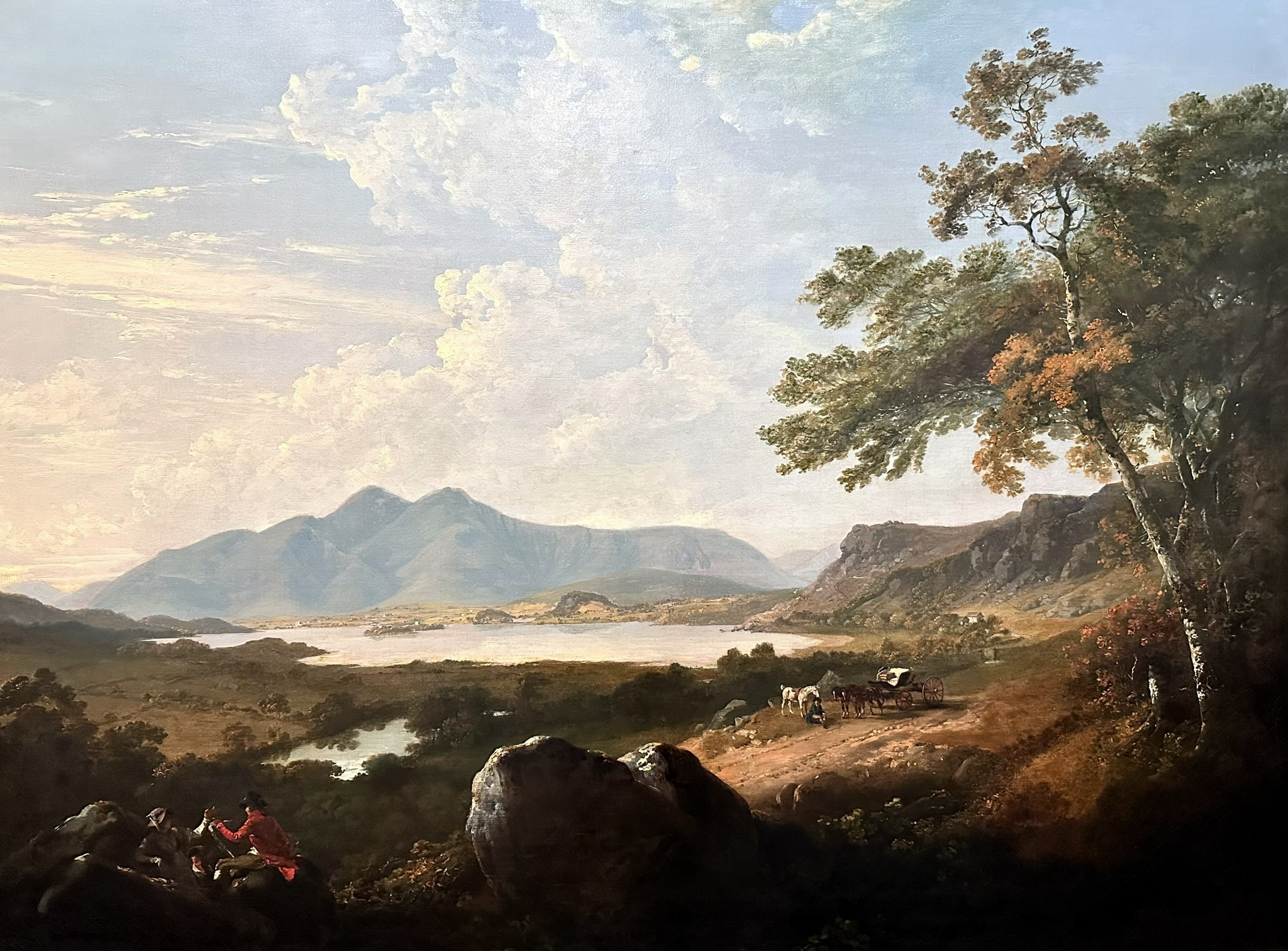
View of Skiddaw from the Head of Derwentwater (1798), Museum of the Shenandoah Valley

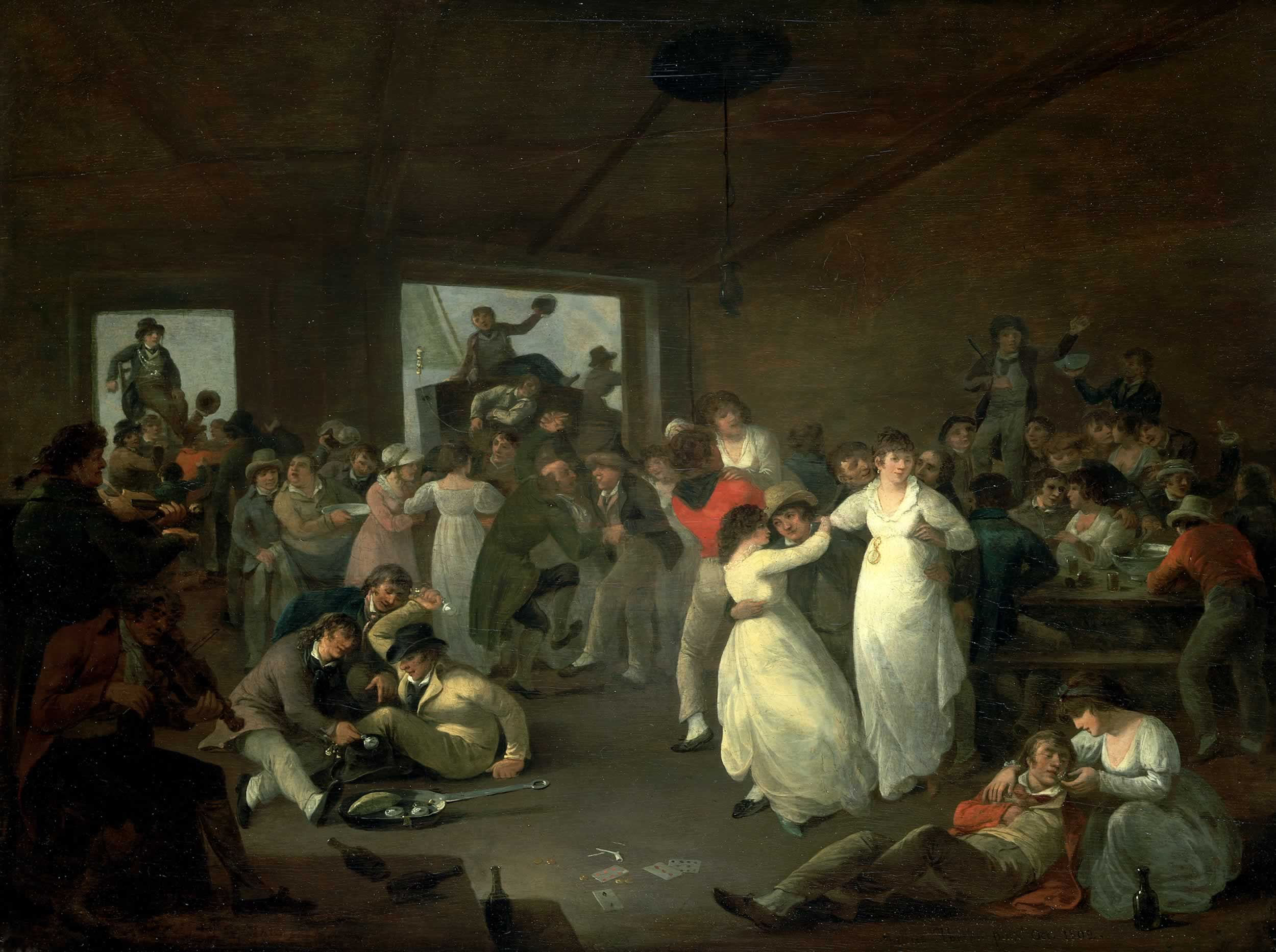
Sailors Carousing (1802), National Maritime Museum
