= Old Dunstonian Association =

The Dunstonian Association
- Established: 1897 in Beckenham, London
- Founder: HM Webb Y Kirkpatrick
- Chair: Jonny Aucamp
- Website: www.stdunstans.org.uk/dunstonian-office

The Dunstonian Association (TDA) is the alumni organisation for former pupils and staff of St Dunstan's College. The association used to be referred to as the 'Old Dunstonian Association'. The TDA have several sports clubs and groups that alumni can join. The TDA runs a number of events for its members. All pupils of St Dunstan's College automatically become lifetime members of the Dunstonian community, and the College has the alumni platform SDConnect that all alumni can register for. This platform is kept updated with events, latest stories and media galleries.

== Dunstonian Sport Clubs ==
Formal OD clubs exist for a number of different sports. Some like those for Rugby and Cricket are long-established with a regular fixture list and their own programmes of off-the-field events, others draw their members together to fulfil occasional fixtures.

== The Notes ==
The official journal of the Dunstonian Association is called The Notes. It is published biannually and features news from the Dunstonian community.

== History ==
The Dunstonian Association was known as the Old Dunstonian Association.

Dunstonians can access the College's extensive collection of records from the school archives dating back to the College's foundation in Catford in 1888 via SDConnect.

== Notable Dunstonians ==
- Matthew d'Ancona, former editor of The Spectator and columnist for the Sunday Telegraph
- Alice Bird, actress
- William Boon FRS, chemist
- Brian Brolly, showbusiness entrepreneur, and co-founder of the radio stations Jazz FM and Classic FM
- Noah Calouri, English rugby union player
- Sir William Castell LVO, Chairman of the Wellcome Trust and a Director of General Electric and BP
- The Rt Hon The Lord Drayson, PC, businessman, entrepreneur and former Defence Minister for Procurement
- Martin Evans, Nobel Prize winner for his work in the field of genetics
- Michael Geliot, opera and theatre director, former Director of Productions for Welsh National Opera
- Dave Gelly, OBE, musician, journalist, critic and author
- Michael Grade, CBE, Baron Grade of Yarmouth, Executive Chairman of ITV
- Hubert Gregg, broadcaster, writer, stage actor
- The Very Revd John Hall, Dean of Westminster
- Peter Hobson, Professor
- (Khalid) Billy Ibadulla, cricketer
- The Rt Revd Dr David Jenkins, former Bishop of Durham
- Frederick Henry Johnson, VC, recipient of the Victoria Cross in the First World War
- Ralph Johnson, fencer
- Sir Paul Judge, business man
- Sir Stephen Laws KCB, QC, former First Parliamentary Counsel
- Kenneth Mees, physicist
- Bill Muirhead, advertising executive
- The Very Revd Ivan Neill, Chaplain General of the British Army and Provost of Sheffield
- John Nettleton, actor
- Geoffrey Nice, barrister
- Steve Nieve (né Steve Nason), musician, Elvis Costello and the Attractions
- J H Prynne, poet
- Matt Salter, former captain of Bristol Rugby
- Wilfred Sanderson, composer and organist
- Peter Snowdon, historian and journalist
- Robert Stanford Tuck, DSO, DFC, fighter pilot and test pilot
- Chuka Umunna, Liberal Democrat MP for Streatham
- Richard Whichello, British Tennis player
- Clifford Wilcock, OBE, engineer and politician
