= Eric Marsh =

Eric Marsh may refer to:

- Eric Marsh (cricketer, born 1920) (1920–2003), English cricketer
- Eric Marsh (cricketer, born 1940) (1940–2017), English first-class cricketer and educator
- Eric "Ricky" Marsh, American basketball player
