= John Penfold =

British architect and surveyor (1828–1909)

John Wornham Penfold
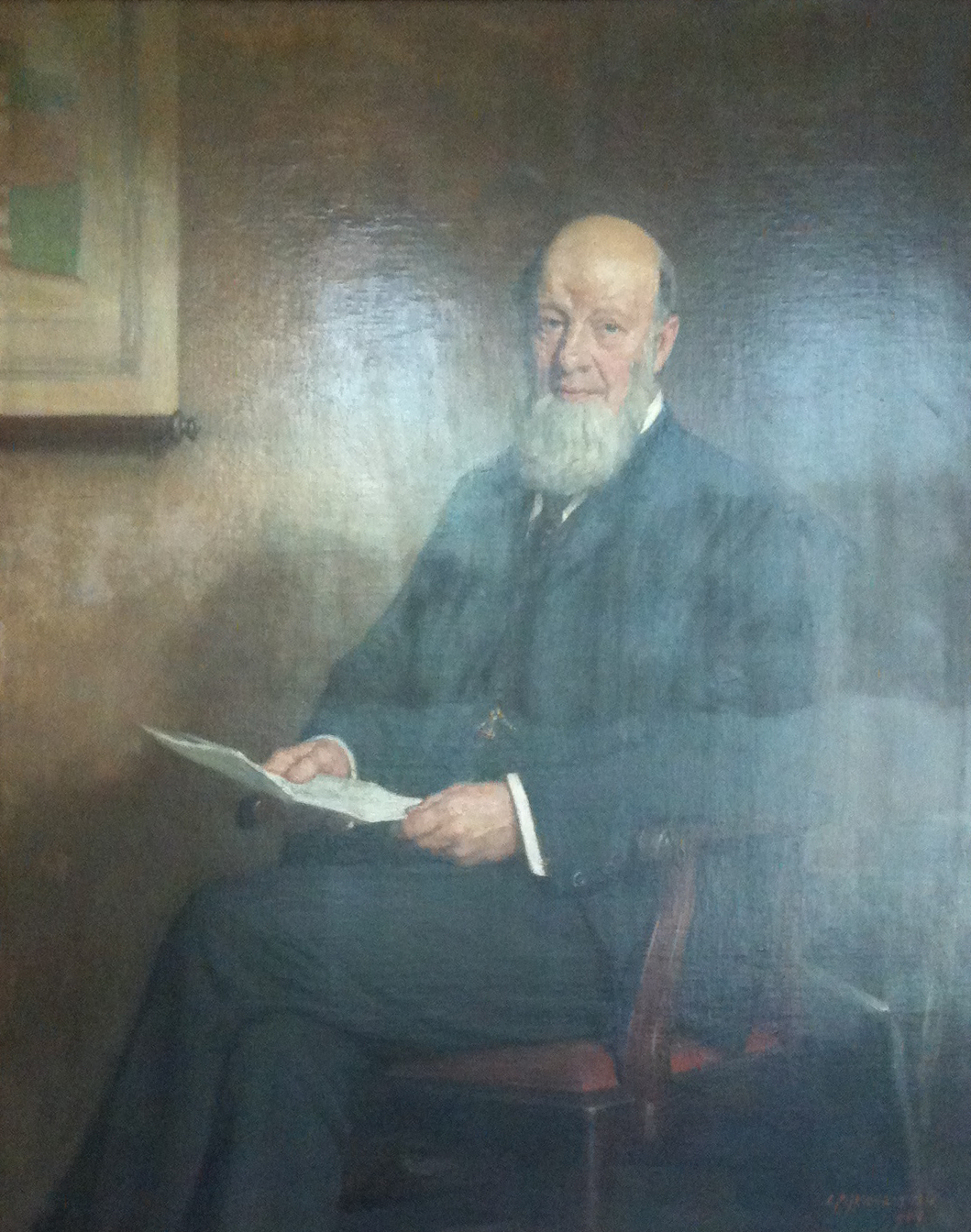
- Born: 3 December 1828; Haslemere, Surrey, England
- Died: 5 July 1909 (aged 80)
- Occupations: surveyor and architect
- Known for: The Penfold pillar box

John Wornham Penfold (3 December 1828 – 5 July 1909) was a surveyor and architect born in Haslemere, Surrey where he is also buried. The house in which he once lived, "Penfolds", is still to be found near the centre of the town.

Penfold served his articles with Thomas Talbot Bury and Charles Lee between 1845 and 1850. He subsequently worked for William Burn, before striking out to his own practice at Charlotte Row, Mansion House, London in 1854.

During his career Penfold was made President of the Architectural Association School of Architecture (1859–1860) and an associate of the Royal Institute of British Architects, becoming a fellow in 1881. He was a founding member of the Royal Institution of Chartered Surveyors and its Honorary Secretary from 1868 to 1904.

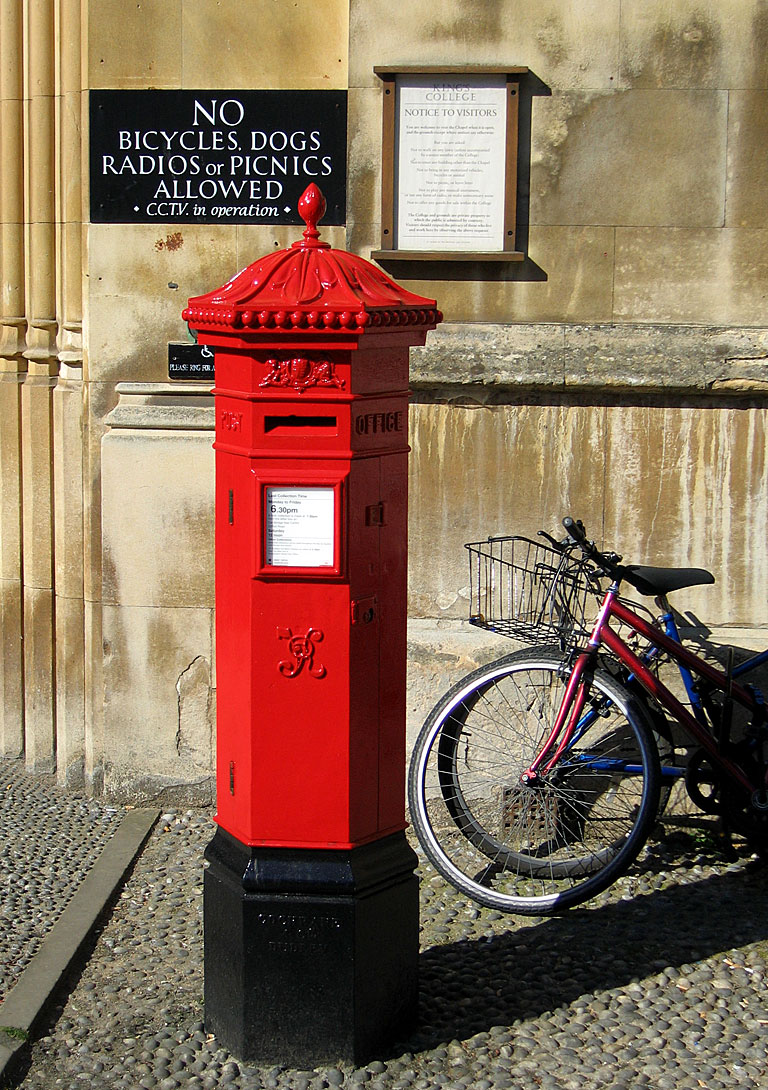
A Penfold post box

Penfold designed the hexagonal British post box in 1866, now known as a Penfold box.

== Trivia ==
In the cartoon series Danger Mouse, Danger Mouse's sidekick is named Penfold after J. W. Penfold, since the duo's secret hideout was in a post box in Baker Street. However, Danger Mouse and Penfold's hideout was not a Penfold box, but an Anonymous box.

== References and sources ==
Notes

Sources

- In memory of John Penfold
