= Jean-Simon Berthélemy =

French painter (1743–1811)

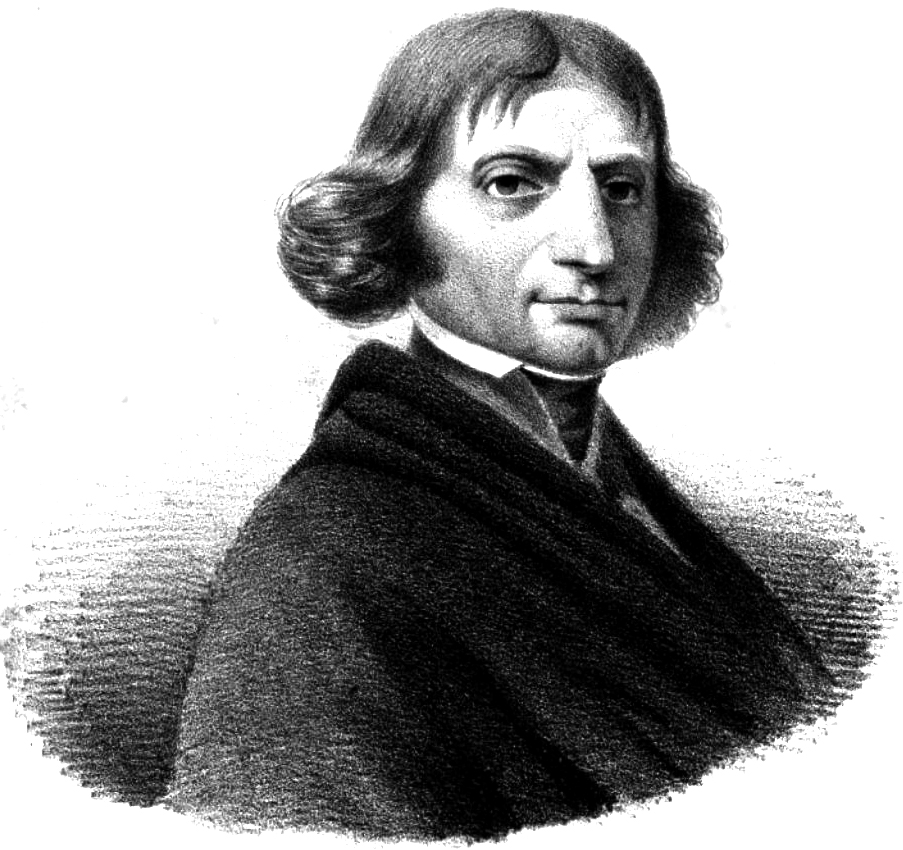
Jean-Simon Berthélemy

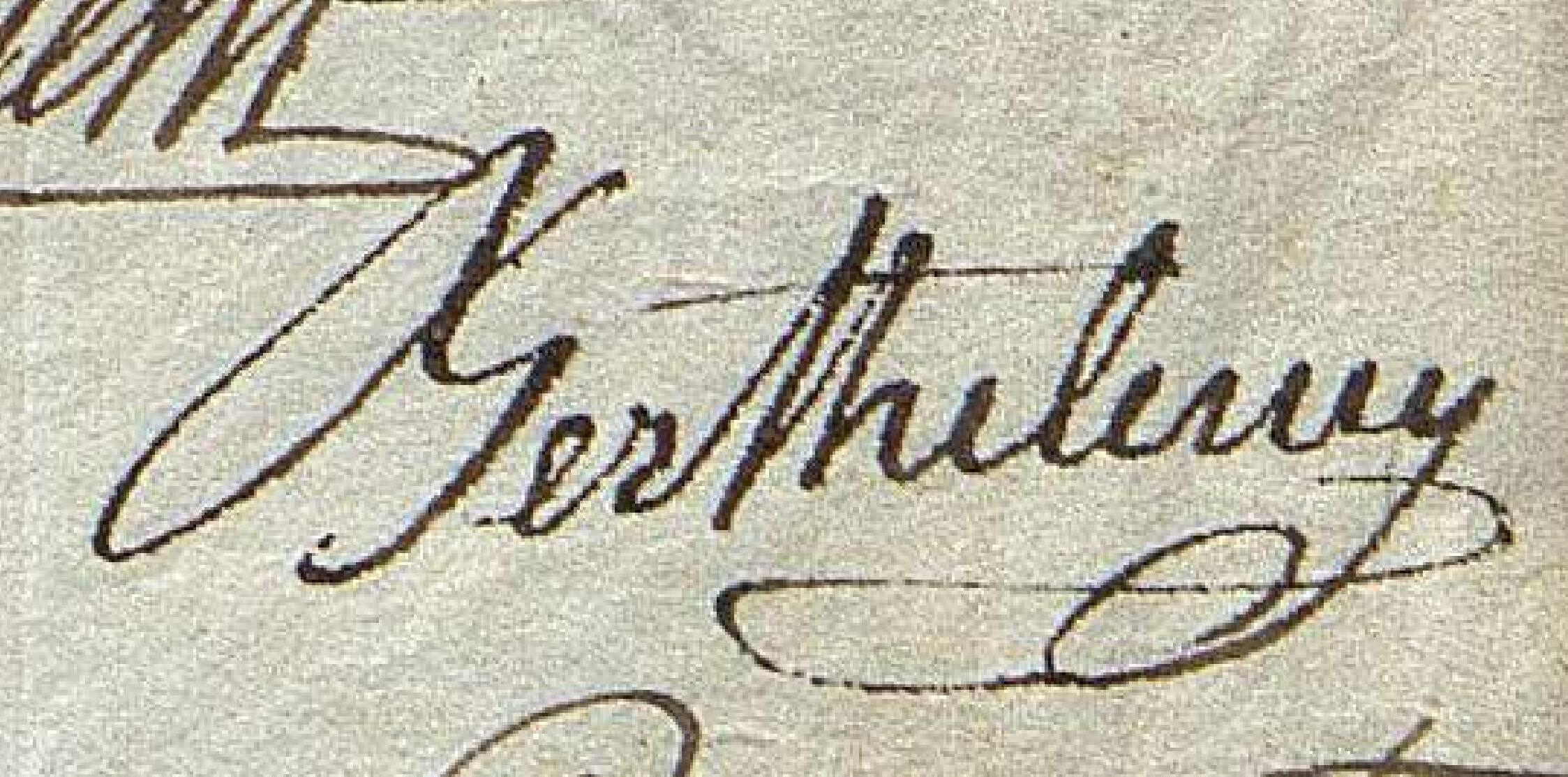

Jean-Simon Berthélemy (5 March 1743 – 1 March 1811) was a French history painter who was commissioned to paint allegorical ceilings for the Palais du Louvre, the Luxembourg Palace and others, in a conservative Late Baroque-Rococo manner only somewhat affected by Neoclassicism.

== Biography ==
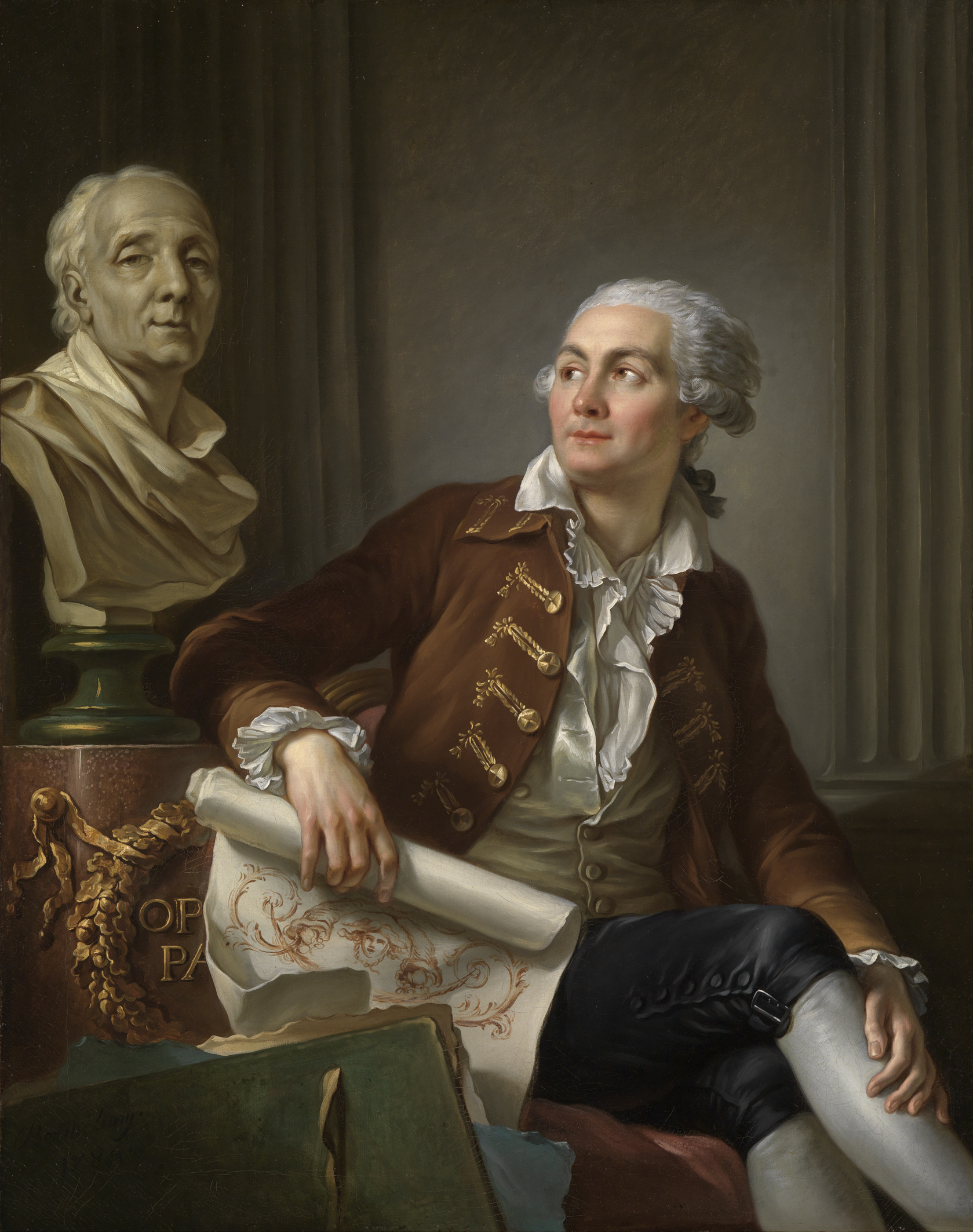
Denis Diderot's bust and young man

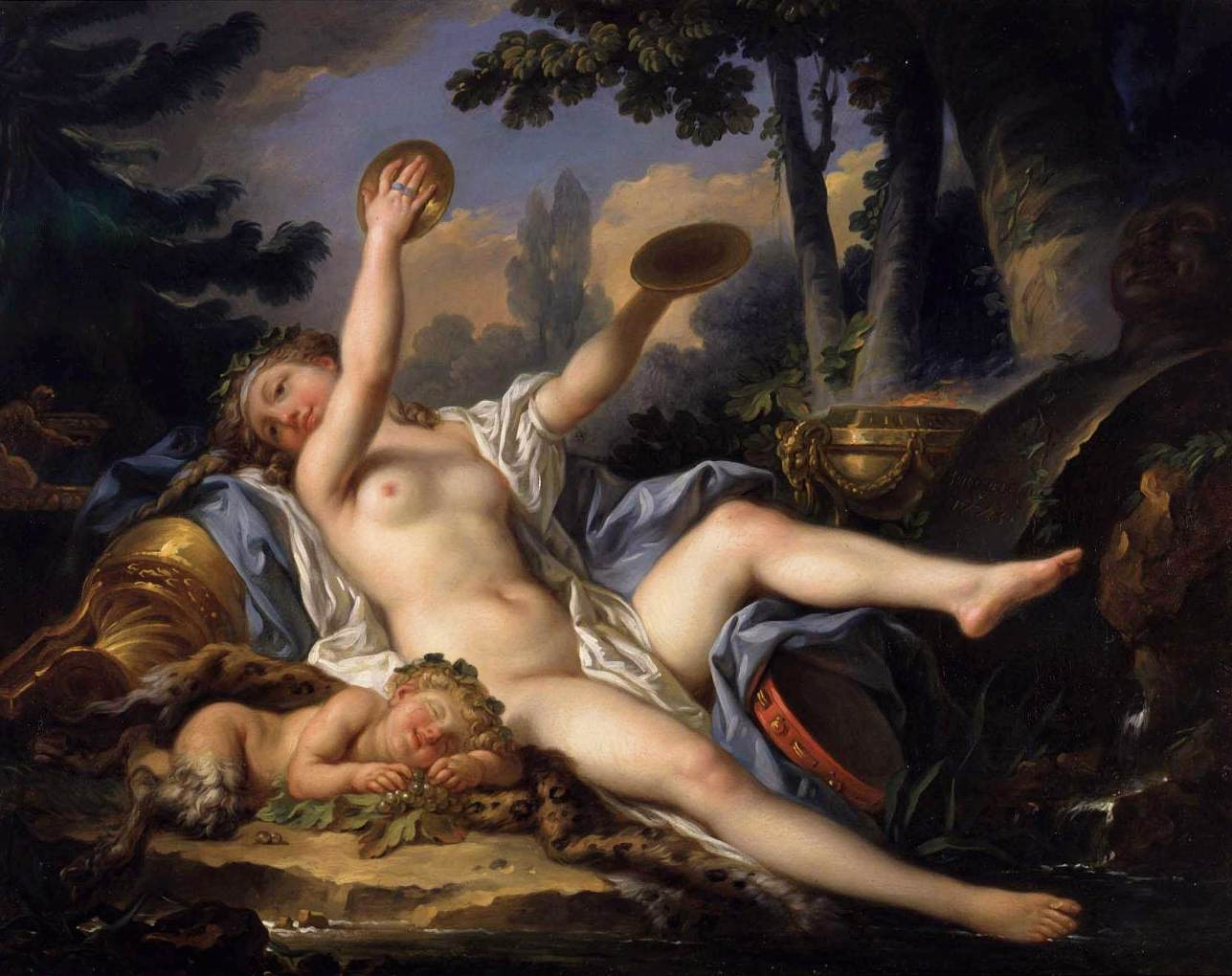
Reclining Bacchante Playing the Cymbals

Berthélemy was born in Laon, Aisne, the son of a sculptor, Jean-Joseph Berthélemy,. He trained in the atelier of Noël Hallé, a professor at the Académie royale de peinture et de sculpture and made his first reputation in the 1760s; after reaching second place in 1763, he won the Prix de Rome of the Académie in 1767. An early commission was for a suite of decorative paintings under the direction of the architect Jean-Gabriel Legendre for the Hôtel de l'Intendance de Champagne at Châlons-sur-Marne, of which the artist only completed six overdoors, much in the manner of François Boucher, and delegated the rest of the commission to a fellow pupil at the Académie.

Berthélemy's master Hallé provided cartoons for the royal tapestry manufacture of the Gobelins, where he was appointed superintendent in 1770; Berthélemy was called upon to provide cartoons for the weavers as well. His Death of Etienne Marcel (1783, on display in the École de Chirurgie) of which the oil sketch survives, was woven in the series Histoire de France.

== Career ==
Berthélemy was an esteemed painter in his day, chosen to join the entourage accompanying Napoleon's campaign in Italy, where he was among the experts assigned the task of selecting works of art to be transferred to Paris under terms of the Treaty of Tolentino, February 1797. He died in Paris. When two monographs on Berthélemy were published in 1979, Philip Conisbee, reviewing them in The Burlington Magazine, observed drily: "Two monographs on Berthélemy is overkill for a painter who could have been dispatched with a single substantial article. The French academic system of art education in the eighteenth century, backed up by the stimulus of church and state patronage, was so efficient and rigorous that even an average talent could be sufficiently conditioned to produce a handful of decent history-paintings, which are sometimes minor masterpieces."

Paintings

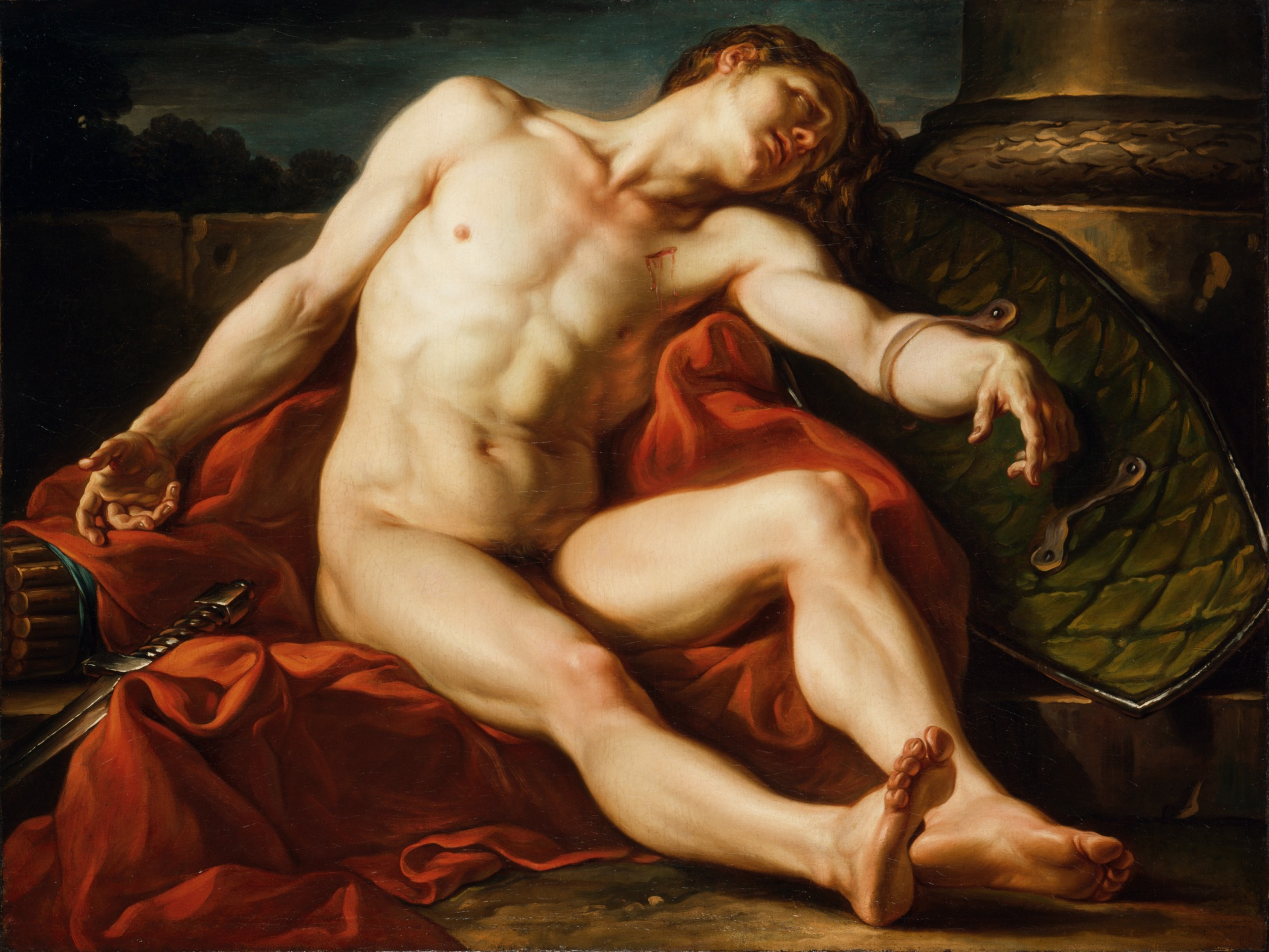
Gladiator

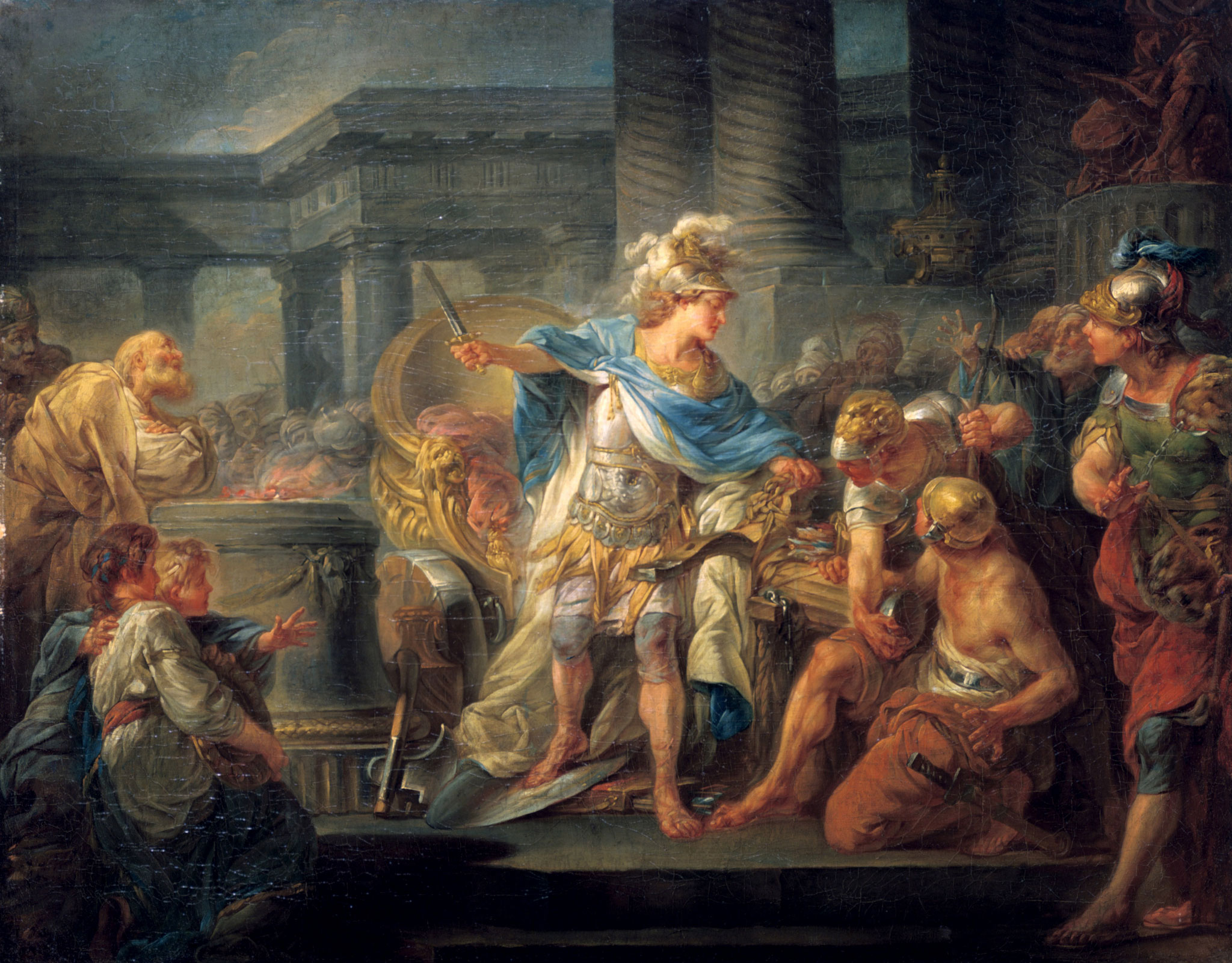
Alexander Cuts the Gordian Knot (École des Beaux-Arts, Paris)

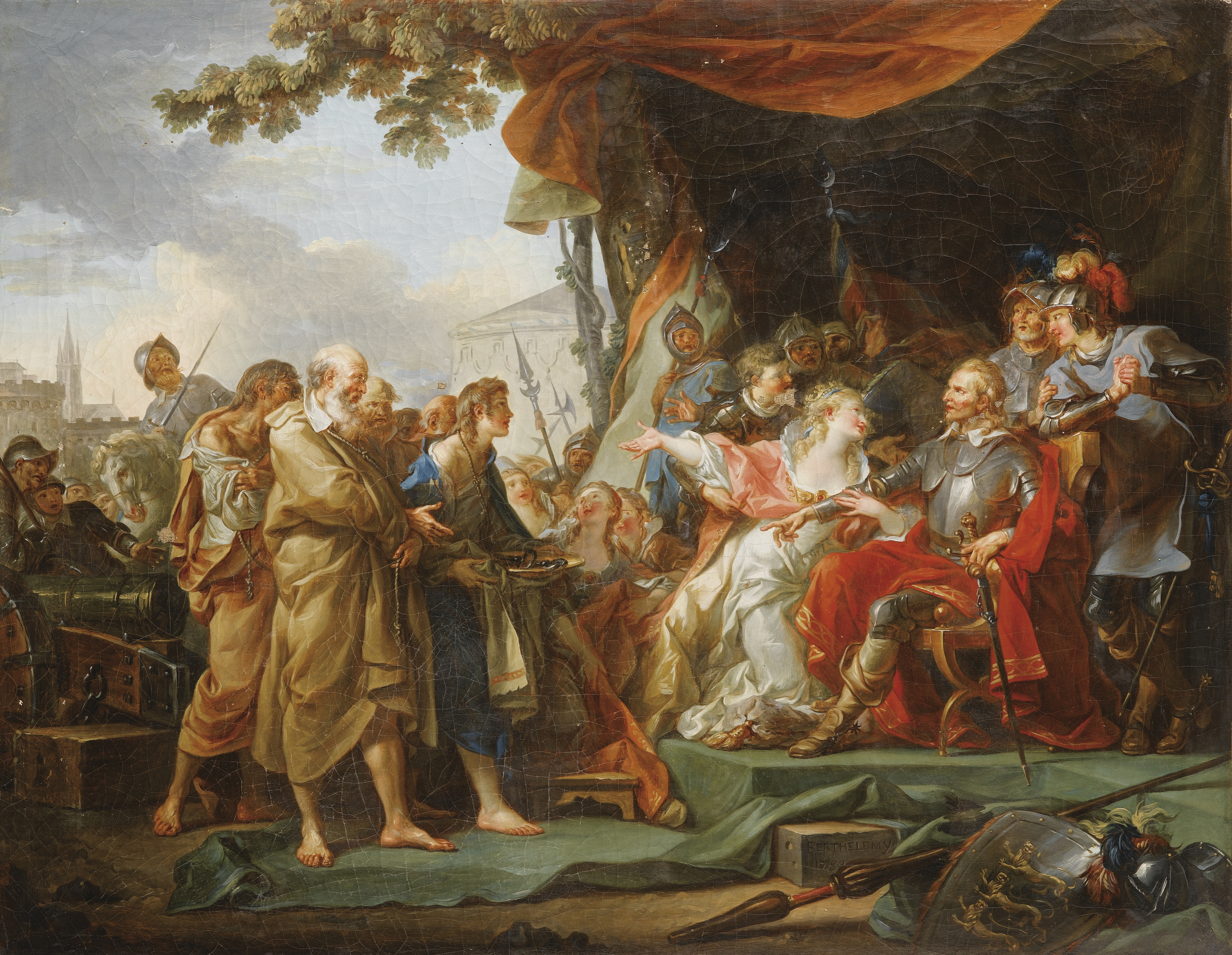
The burgers of Calais

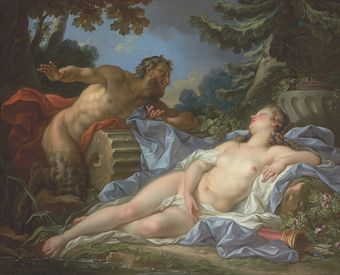
Jupiter and Antiope

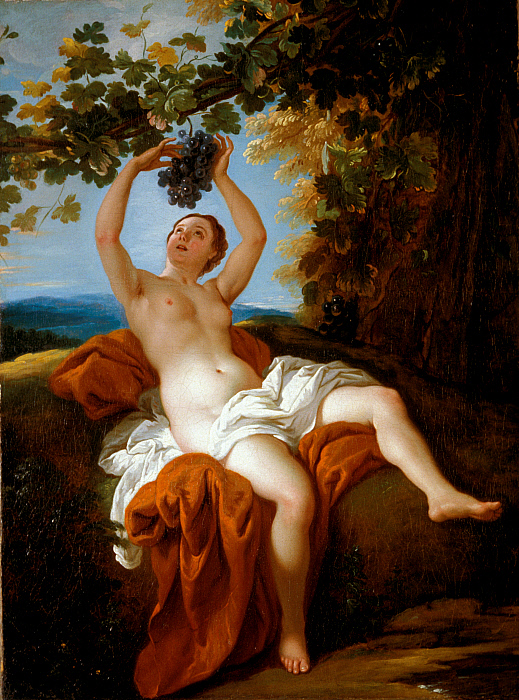
Attributed to Jean Simon Berthélemy, Erigone (1753–1811), Oil on canvas, 27 5/16 x 20 3/16 in. (69.3 x 51.3 cm), Clark Art Institute
