= St Dunstan's College =

Public school in Catford, London

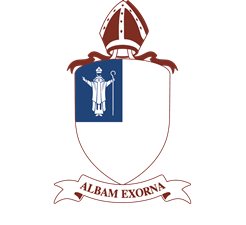

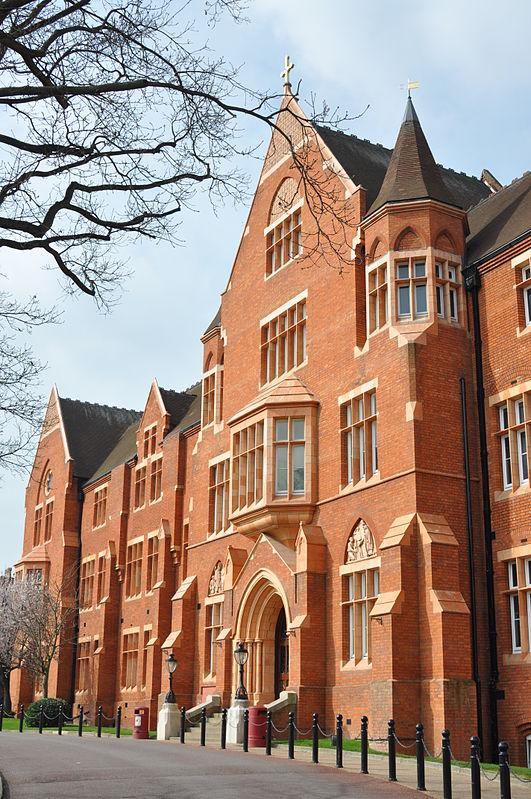

Location
- Stanstead Road, Catford; London Borough of Lewisham, London, SE6 4TY; England; 51.44386°N 0.02937°W

Information
- Type: Public School; Private day school
- Motto: Albam Exorna (English: Adorn the white)
- Religious affiliation: Church of England
- Established: 1888
- Local authority: Lewisham
- Department for Education URN: 100754 Tables
- Chairman of Governors: Paul Durgan
- Head: Nick Hewlett
- Staff: 150
- Gender: Co-educational
- Age: 3 to 18
- Enrolment: 1043 (2021)
- Houses: 6
- Colours: Maroon & Royal Blue
- Alumni: Old Dunstonians
- Website: http://www.stdunstans.org.uk

St Dunstan's College is a co-educational private day school in Catford, south-east London, England. It is a registered charity, and a member of the Headmasters' and Headmistresses' Conference and the Independent Association of Prep School Heads. The college is made up of a junior school for 3-10 year olds, a senior school for 11-16 year olds and a sixth form for 16-18 year olds.

== History ==
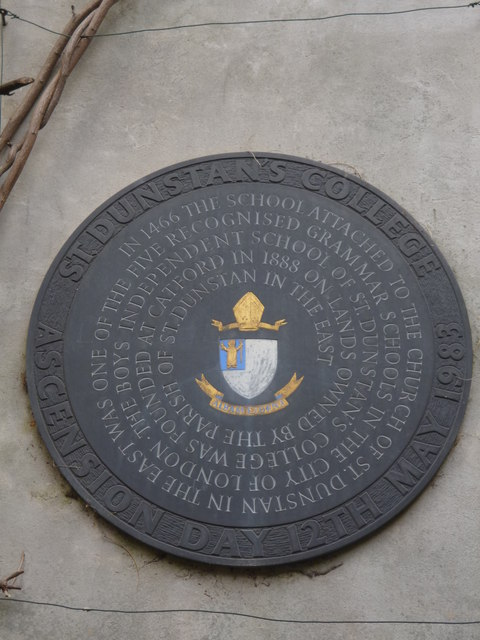
Plaque commemorating the school's antecedent site at St Dunstan in the East, commissioned for Ascension Day (1983)

A grammar school has been associated with the parish of St Dunstan-in-the-East since 1446. The original school operated until the early 16th century, providing education for boys aged 7–11 in the City of London. In the late 19th century, the opportunities of the Industrial Revolution spurred the parishioners of St Dunstan-in-the-East to establish a school on lands owned by the church.

The present site in Catford was chosen in 1854. The architect Edward Norton Clifton, modifying originals plans by Sir William Tite, designed the college's main building, which is a late extant example of the Gothic revival in London. The college officially opened in 1888 as a day and boarding public school.

During the First World War, 977 former and current St Dunstan's pupils enlisted, of whom 233 died during the conflict. Frederick Henry Johnson, a former pupil when he joined up, was awarded the Victoria Cross for gallantry at the Battle of Loos.

The college's war dead are memorialised at St George's Church in Ypres, the battlefield at Loos, and on the dais of the Great Hall at St Dunstan's.

The college's memorial reads Albam Exornarunt ("they adorned the white"), an ergo post facto modification of the instructive Albam Exorna motto.

=== Growth and Change ===
From the late 1950s, development at the Catford site accelerated. A swimming pool was added in 1955 and cricket pavilion and nets in 1958. The college's famous glass-walled dining hall was built in 1961. The hyperbolic paraboloid roof requires no internal supports, and at the time was one of only four hyperbolic paraboloid structures in the world.

In 1994, the college expanded to include a pre-prep school for ages four and above. That same year, St Dunstan's became a co-educational school, with the gradual integration of girls at all ages.

In 2018, the college opened its pupil wellness centre, which offers a dedicated facility for pupil wellbeing. The centre houses the school nurse, chaplain and counselling services. In the same year, the college developed two new multi-use games areas (MUGAs) for its sports department, and the wider community, located at the college's Jubilee Grounds.

In January 2020, the most significant developments started on the school site since its foundation in 1888. A new Junior School building, STEM block and Sixth Form Centre was added to the grounds. At the time, Head Nick Hewlett said 'As one of the first schools in the world to have invested in science and technology laboratories, it seems fitting that, 130 years on, we are creating state-of-the-art STEM facilities for the next generation of Dunstonians.'

Following the opening of the STEM Block, the old science block and design engineering workshops were transformed into a performing arts centre.

In January 2023, the school announced a merger with Rosemead Preparatory School in Dulwich. Speaking about the merger, St Dunstan's Head, Nick Hewlett, said: 'We are delighted to be bringing our schools together, which will strengthen and enrich both our communities. The two schools have a long and deep commitment to a values-driven education, preparing our young students for the world of tomorrow.'

== Awards ==
In recent years, St Dunstan's has been recognised in several industry awards. In 2020, the school won Co-educational School of the Year at the Independent Schools of the Year Awards. In June 2022, the school was named Independent Senior School of the year at the Tes Awards in London. The College film 'Albam Exorna' also won two awards at the 28th annual Communicator Awards in New York in May 2022. In 2023, St Dunstan's was named Most Progressive School in London at the Private Education Awards.

== House System ==
The first house system was introduced in 1914 to help improve the school's morale and organise sport teams. The houses were named after places near to the school (e.g. Catford, Forest Hill, Hither Green) and pupils were allocated to them based on where they lived.

After the first World War, where hundreds of boys from the school had lost their lives, the houses were renamed after some of the most decorated pupils that served in the war. The new house names were as follows: Bennett (pink), Goosey (dark blue), Griffiths (green), Johnson (purple), Lane (white), Ross (yellow), Thomas (red) and Wilson (light blue).

Before September 2023, the houses are named after the first four headmasters of the college. They were called Usherwood (Yellow), Forder (Red), Stuart (Blue) and Hecker (Green).

Currently, the house system contains 6 houses, Canterbury, Glastonbury, Ghent, Stepney, Mendip and Worcester, that are named after significant places St. Dunstan lived in.

== The Forder Programme ==
The Forder Programme is the name given to St Dunstan's co-curriculum. The programme is named after the second headmaster of the college, the Revd Forder, who believed passionately that schools should offer more to the education of young people than classroom learning. Revd Forder's education philosophy was to put the health and character of a pupil above the acquisition of knowledge, which led to the introduction of a pioneering programme of 'outside activities'. The first programme which ran at the end of the school day on three afternoons each week included 'wireless telegraphy, dramatic works, French reading, the production of an honest newspaper, map modelling or lecturettes on industries or photography'.

Today, the college describes the Forder Programme as an 'ambitious, forward-thinking programme that gives each individual the freedom to create their own journey'. The programme is categorised into five areas, which are based on the college values: curiosity, compassion, courage, creativity, and confidence.

The Forder Programme now has more than 90 activities for pupils to choose from, including the college's Combined Cadet Force and the Duke of Edinburgh Award.

== St Dunstan's Festival ==
The St Dunstan's Festival originated in the 1990s under the stewardship of Anthony Seldon, who was deputy head of the college at that time. It was originally named 'The Catford Arts Festival' and ran over two and a half days at the very start of July.

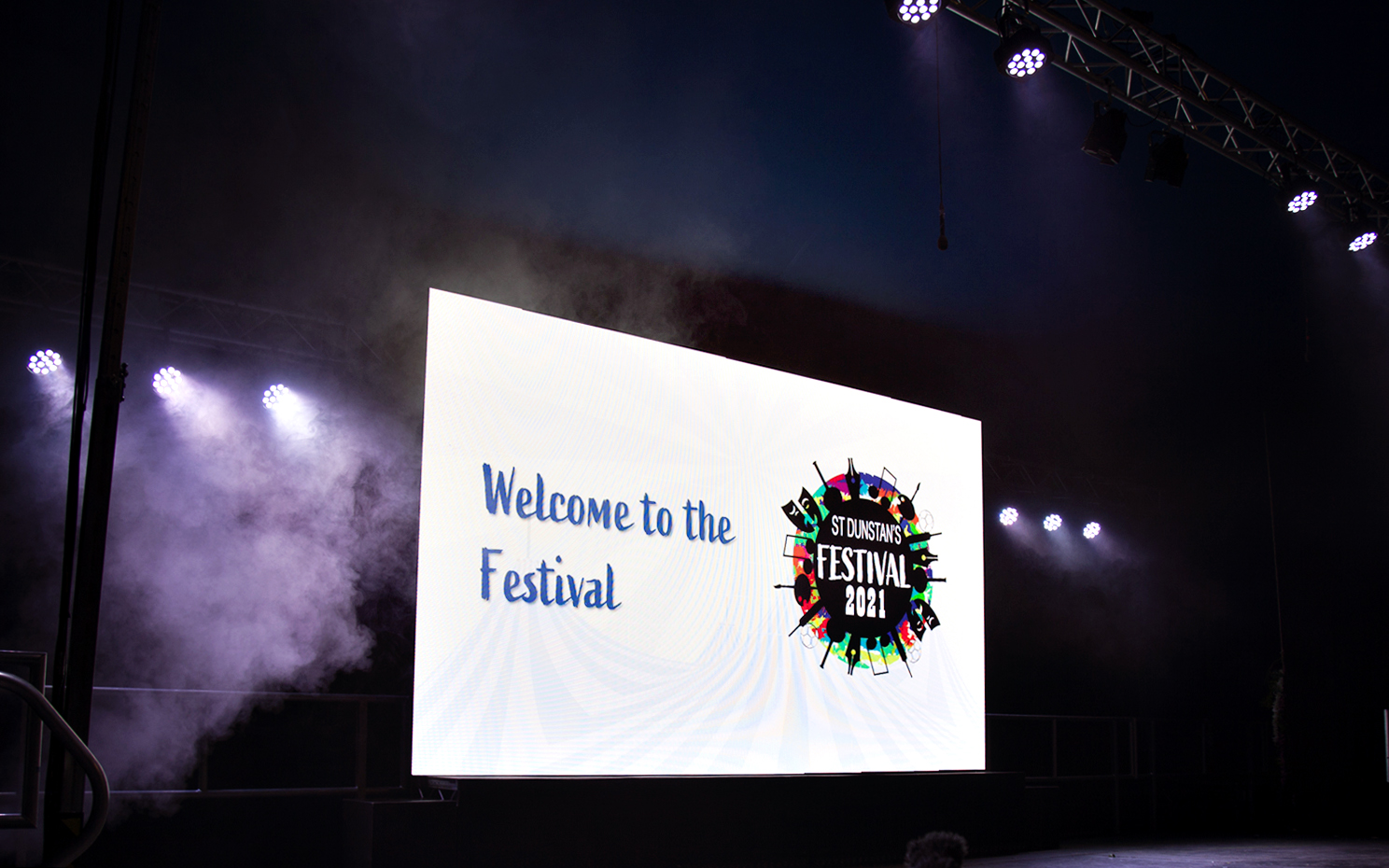

The festival was quickly dubbed 'The Edinburgh Festival of South London' and comprised over twenty main events and 'a rich and enterprising fringe'. The 1994 college Chronicle describes the festival as 'catering for the souls' and it contained an array of eclectic events including the St Dunstan's jazz group, lectures given by writers Brian Masters and Gwendoline Butler, and a Shakespeare play with a twist, entitled 'A Pocket of Midsummer Night's Dream'.

The festival was short-lived, only lasting a few years. The current headmaster, Nick Hewlett, reignited the festival on his arrival at the college, with its relaunch occurring in the summer of 2015. The now two-week event is an established event associated with the end of the academic year, enabling pupils to engage with a variety of activities and performances involving both the college and the broader Lewisham community. In 2019 Doreen Lawrence and LGBT author Shaun Dellenty were special guests at the festival's evening on diversity and inclusion.

== Archives at St Dunstan's ==
The college's archives contain a rich collection of artefacts relating to the history of the school as well as of the local area. The college works closely with Lewisham Historical Society and in 2018 the college's timeline corridor was opened showcasing original items dating back to 1888. To name but a few rare items, the school has an original lacrosse stick which dates back to the 1930s (the school was the first in the country to promote the game to boys), and the Victoria Cross belonging to Frederick Henry Johnson. The college also operates a dedicated site with digitalised archives which have been of fascinating interest for pupils, alumni and members of the local community.

== School publications ==
The college publishes a termly magazine, The Shield, formerly known as Moment by Moment. The magazine features the latest school news and events from each term, with input from staff and pupils. At the end of each academic year, The Chronicle is also published which highlights the year's achievements.

== Heads ==
- Charles M. Stuart, 1888–1922
- Frank G. Forder, 1922–1930
- John F. Usherwood, 1930-1938
- William R. Hecker, 1938–1967
- Richard R. Pedley, 1967–1973
- Brian D. Dance, 1973-1994
- David Moore, 1994–1998
- Ian Davies, 1998–2004
- Jane Davies, 2005–2014
- Nick Hewlett, 2014–present

== The Dunstonian Association ==
The Dunstonian Association, formerly known as the Old Dunstonian Association, is the alumni organisation for former pupils and staff at the college. Each year, the association sponsors a number of events for its members and sports clubs which members can join. The association also supports senior pupils with career advice and work experience placements.

== Notable alumni ==
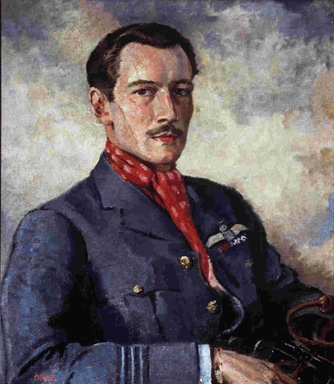
Robert Stanford Tuck, WWII fighter ace

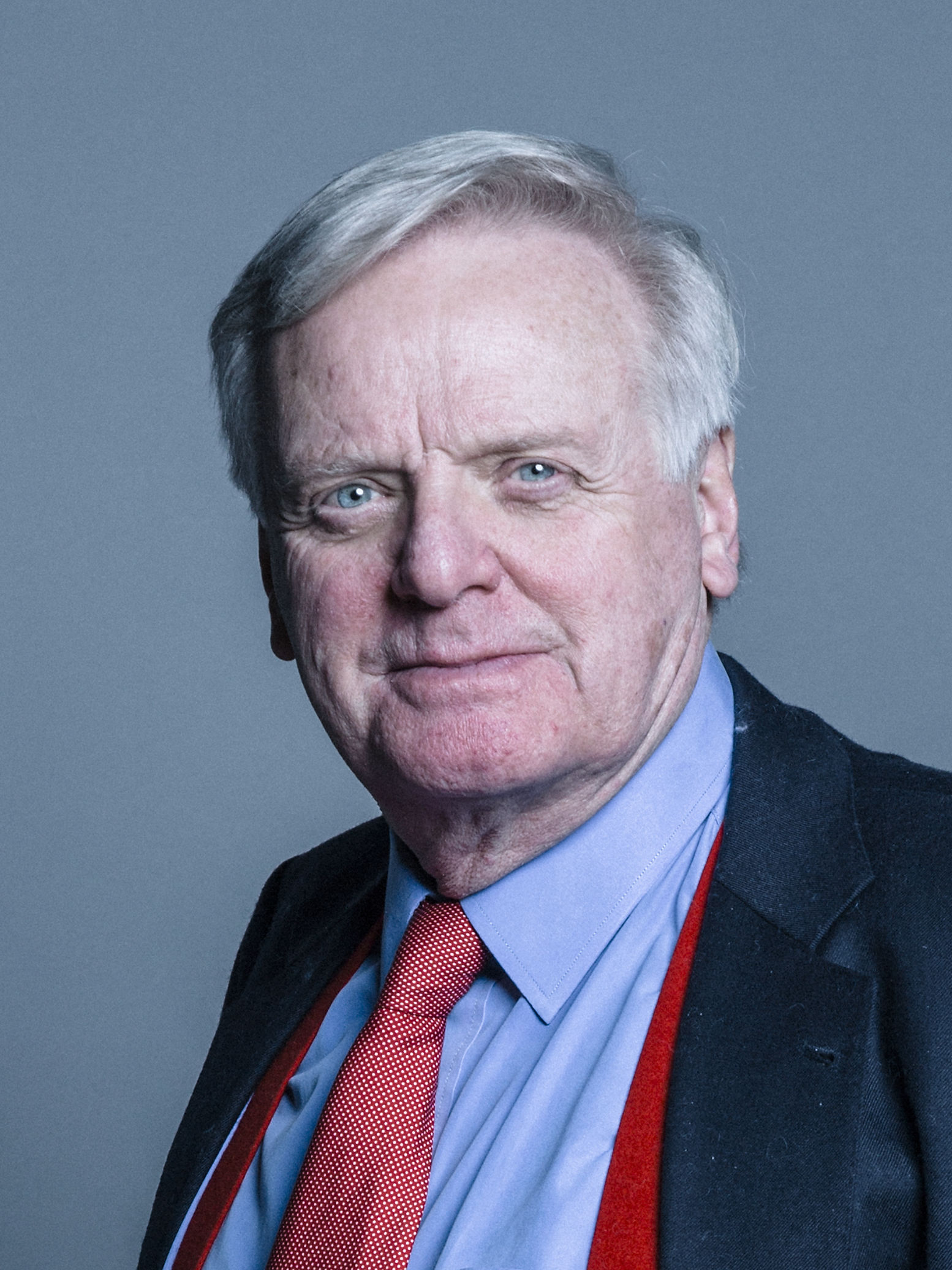
Michael Grade, Chairman of the BBC and Ofcom

- Matthew d'Ancona, former editor of The Spectator and columnist for the Sunday Telegraph.
- Edward Neville da Costa Andrade, physicist, poet, and writer, Andrade was also a broadcaster, coming to fame during the Second World War on BBC radio's The Brains Trust.
- William Boon, chemist.
- A. C. Bouquet (1884-1976), theologian, academic and writer
- Brian Brolly, show business entrepreneur, and co-founder of the radio stations Jazz FM and Classic FM.
- Sir William Castell, chairman of the Wellcome Trust and a director of General Electric and BP.
- Henry Davies, cricketer.
- Paul Drayson, Baron Drayson, businessman, entrepreneur and former defence minister for procurement.
- Hugh Eliot, fighter pilot of World War II
- Martin Evans, Nobel Prize winner for his work in the field of genetics.
- Dave Gelly, musician, journalist, critic and author.
- Michael Grade, Baron Grade of Yarmouth, executive chairman of ITV.
- Hubert Gregg, broadcaster, writer, stage actor.
- John Robert Hall, dean of Westminster.
- Walter Hamilton, former headmaster of Westminster School, Rugby School and Magdalene College, Cambridge.
- David Edward Jenkins, former bishop of Durham.
- Frederick Henry Johnson, recipient of the Victoria Cross in the First World War.
- Paul Judge, businessman.
- Stephen Laws, former First Parliamentary Counsel.
- Eric Marsh, cricketer.
- Ivan Neill, chaplain general of the British Army and provost of Sheffield.
- Steve Nieve, (né Steve Nason), musician, Elvis Costello and the Attractions.
- Martin Rutty, courier entrepreneur and helicopter adventurer.
- J. H. Prynne, poet and University Reader in English Poetry at the University of Cambridge.
- Matt Salter, former captain of Bristol Rugby.
- Robert Stanford Tuck, fighter pilot and test pilot.
- Chuka Umunna, former Liberal Democrat MP for Streatham.
- Clifford Wilcock, engineer and politician.
- Roger Cardinal, art scholar and professor
- Wilfrid Sanderson, composer and organist
- Geoffrey Nice, lawyer, lead prosecutor at the trial of Slobodan Milošević and chair of Uyghur Tribunal.
- John Shone, dean of the Diocese of St Andrews, Dunkeld and Dunblane
- Peter Snowdon, historian and journalist.
- Richard Watson, cricketer.
- William Dawnay-Mould, Australian politician.
- Philip Conisbee, art historian and curator for the National Gallery of Art.
- Geoffrey Caston, former registrar of the University of Oxford.
- Philip Jones, historian of medieval Italy.
- Lumsden Hare, film and theatre director.
- Nigel Higgins, chairman of Barclays Bank.
- Noah Caluori, Rugby Union, Saracens.
