= Polish Church of St John the Evangelist, Putney =

Roman Catholic church in Putney, London, England

Coordinates: 51.459870°N 0.219366°W

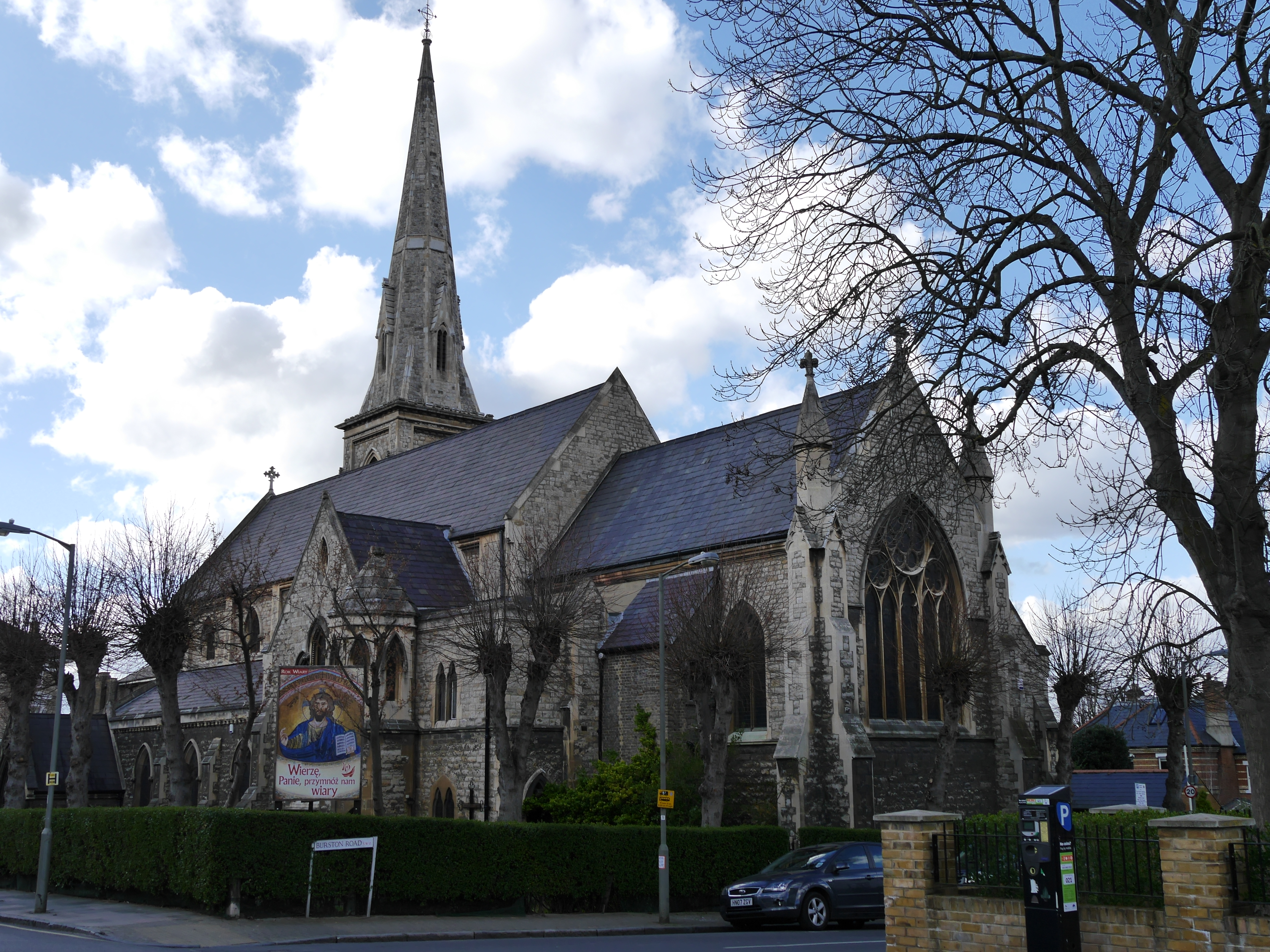
Polish Church of St. John the Evangelist, Putney

The Polish Church of St. John the Evangelist (Polish: Polski Kościół Św. Jana Ewangelisty) is a Grade II listed Roman Catholic church at St John's Avenue, Putney, London SW15 6AW.

It was built in 1858, and the architect was Charles Lee. It was formerly the Anglican church of St John the Evangelist, and retained its title after it was transferred to the Roman Catholic Church.

It was extended several times. In 1865 the tower and spire were enlarged, in 1888 the chancel and aisles were extended, in 1898 the vestry was extended, and in 1910 the south chapel and porch were added. The priest and writer A. C. Bouquet married here in 1910.

The church was badly damaged by aerial bombardment in 1944, towards the end of the Second World War. It was closed for several years in order for repairs to be carried out, and was not re-opened until 1948. Francis H Spear replaced the stained glass.

In 1977, the church was declared redundant. It was initially leased, and the freehold granted in 2007, to Polish Catholics who retained its name; the parish is run by the missionary Society of Christ Fathers. The proceeds of the lease (£80,000) went to rebuilding St Mary's Putney after that church had been damaged in a fire.
