= Henry Davies (Oxford University cricketer) =

English cricketer

Personal information
- Full name: Henry Richard Davies
- Born: 2 September 1970 (age 56); Camberwell, London, England
- Batting: Left-handed
- Bowling: Right-arm off-break

Domestic team information
- Years: Team
- 1990–1992: Oxford University

Career statistics
| Competition | First-class |
|---|---|
| Matches | 17 |
| Runs scored | 178 |
| Batting average | 12.71 |
| 100s/50s | –/– |
| Top score | 39 |
| Balls bowled | 1,846 |
| Wickets | 13 |
| Bowling average | 105.92 |
| 5 wickets in innings | – |
| 10 wickets in match | – |
| Best bowling | 3/93 |
| Catches/stumpings | –/– |
- Source: Cricinfo, 26 February 2020

Henry Richard Davies (born 2 September 1970) is an English former first-class cricketer.

Davies was born at Camberwell in September 1970. He was educated at St Dunstan's College, before going up to Christ Church, Oxford. While studying at Oxford, he played first-class cricket for Oxford University, making his debut against Hampshire in 1990. He played first-class cricket for Oxford until 1992, making a total of seventeen appearances. He scored a total of 178 runs in his seventeen matches, averaging 12.71 and with a high score of 39. With his right-arm off-break bowling, he took 13 wickets at a bowling average of 105.92, with best figures of 3 for 93.
