= Martin Rutty =

British entrepreneur

Martin Ashley Rutty (4 February 1960 – 9 December 2010) was a British entrepreneur in the London courier industry, and an adventurer and British Champion helicopter pilot. He was the first person to fly in a piston engine helicopter from Cambridge, England to Adelaide, Australia, unsupported, in 1999.

== Early life ==
Rutty grew up in Forest Hill, in south east London. His father was a general practitioner, and his mother was a housewife. He was the middle of three children. He was educated as a day pupil at the nearby St Dunstan's College, Catford, London. He attended Bangor University for a short while before returning to London to be a despatch rider.

== Speed Couriers ==
Rutty founded Speed Couriers, a motorcycle despatch company in London, England, in 1978 in a former basement coal cellar under New Oxford Street in London WC1. The company suffered a serious setback in the late 1980s recession, but by 1995 the company's sales were "around £6 million" and the company had moved to the London Docklands and had added offices in Telford, Welshpool Manchester and Cambridge. The company grew by acquisition in the 1990s, and bought a dozen rivals in 1994/5. In 1998 the company claimed on its website to have made 35 acquisitions to date, and was selling franchises. By 1999 sales were "£15 million", the service was UK-wide, and customers included Orange and Ondigital. By the early 2000s the business as a whole had ceased to trade, and parts of it were sold.

== Helicopter championships ==
Rutty competed successfully in various helicopter championships events. Together with his navigator Simon Lichtenstein he won the British Helicopter Championships (Club Class) four times in five years up to 2008. He participated as pilot in the FAI World Helicopter Championships 1996 and 1999 with co-pilot Timothy Gilbert, and in 2002, 2005 and 2008 all with Simon Lichtenstein as co-pilot, all as part of Team GB.

== UK to Australia by helicopter ==
In 1999 Rutty flew in his Robinson R44 registration G-BXUK (which had been repaired following a heavy landing incident prior to Rutty's ownership) from Cambridge Airport, Cambridge, England, to Adelaide Airport, Adelaide, Australia. The journey totalled 13,506 nautical miles, and lasted 163 flight hours over 48 days, raising money for SOS Children's Villages. In purely aviation terms, the journey was largely without incident. However, on 12 October 1999 Rutty landed in Gwadar in western Pakistan, the day of the 1999 Pakistani coup d'état. This coincidence of timing led to a night of imprisonment. A last-minute change of route to enter Australia at Kununurra instead of Darwin, led to a threat of further arrest, this time by Australian Immigration officials. On 18 May 2000 Rutty was awarded a certificate by the Council and members of The Air League, in recognition of his achievement.

== Death ==
Rutty was killed in a helicopter accident near Tourrettes-sur-Loup in France on 9 December 2010, while flying from Cuneo in Italy to the UK. The aircraft in which he died (together with Simon Lichtenstein) was a Robinson R22 helicopter registration G-CBVL. The official investigation into the accident concluded that "the accident was likely due to an inappropriate input on the flight controls by the pilot in turbulent conditions. This input caused rotor shaft bumping that resulted in a deviation in main rotor rotation and the failure of the main blades’ droop restrainer". The report lists a number of similar accidents in the history of the R22. The manufacturer issued in 1999 a "Safety Notice" for pilots of its aircraft indicating specific actions to be taken if high winds and turbulence are encountered. The mountainous area in which the accident happened is known locally for its turbulent conditions.
