= A. C. Bouquet =

Alan Coates Bouquet in 1933

Alan Coates Bouquet (24 May 1884 – 4 March 1976) was a minister in the Anglican church, a theologian and Recognised Lecturer in the History and Comparative Study of Religions at the University of Cambridge and a prolific writer on religious themes.

== Early life ==
Of Huguenot descent, he was born in Forest Hill in London in 1884, the son of Elizabeth née Stow (1852-1916) and Robert Coates Bouquet (1842-1928), Registrar to the Art Union of London for over 40 years until it was wound up in 1912. In his youth Bouquet was in close contact with 19th-century artists and craftsmen. His early education was at St Dunstan's College before attending University College London in 1901. He attended Trinity College, Cambridge and was a Lady Kay Scholar at Jesus College, Cambridge where he variously took his B.A. degree in 1905, his M.A. in 1910, a B.D. degree in 1918, and was awarded D.D. in 1922. He was ordained a deacon in 1907 and priest in 1908; he was a curate at Putney in London. While serving in his parish in Putney he met Edith Gertrude Sayer (1881-1952) whom he married on 6 June 1910 at the church of St John the Evangelist in Putney. During World War I Bouquet served with the Royal Army Chaplains' Department on home service from 1915 to 1919.

== Return to Cambridge ==
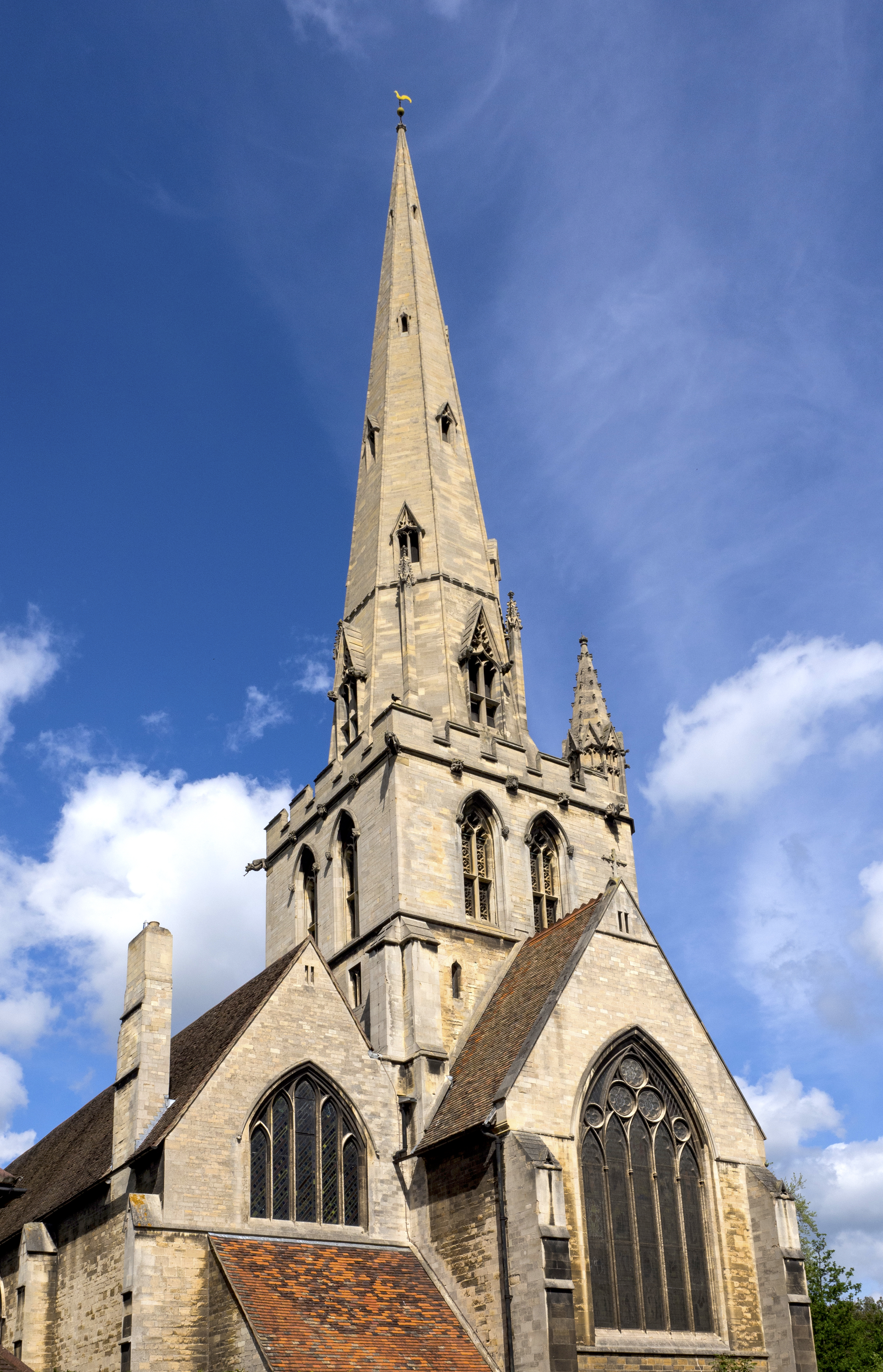
Bouquet was vicar at All Saints' Church in Cambridge from 1923 to 1945

From 1920 to 1922 Bouquet was among the honorary staff at St Martin-in-the-Fields. He returned to Cambridge in 1922 where he combined pastoral and academic work, taking his D.D. degree in 1922 with his thesis 'Is Christianity the Final Religion?', published as a book in the same year. He was the vicar at All Saints' Church in Cambridge from 1923 to 1945 and in addition held the Hulsean (1924) and Stanton Lectureships at Cambridge and the Upton Lectureship at Oxford as well as lecturing at Jesus College, Cambridge and Trinity College, Cambridge. In 1929 he took part in a geographical survey of the island of Corsica. He was a delegate to four Anglo-Scandinavian Theological Conferences and in the early 1930s was a Visitor to the universities of Bonn and Marburg. In 1935 he lectured at the International Theological Seminar at the University of Geneva and at a Congress on the History of Religion at Amsterdam in 1950. From 1939 to 1941 he was President of the Cambridge University Theological Society, was President of the University Judo Club and was vice-president of the Cambridge University Anthropological Club. Bouquet served as an Honorary Chaplain to H.M. Forces during World War II. In 1952 he travelled to Israel and the Middle East in preparation for his book Everyday Life in New Testament Times (1953).

From the early 1930s to his death in 1976 Bouquet lived at Gilling House on Madingley Road in Cambridge.

A. C. Bouquet died at Cambridge in 1976 and left £10,449 in his will. His wife predeceased him in 1952.

== Publications ==
- A Point of View, 1913.
- When He Is Come, 1917.
- The Greatest Relationship, 1919.
- Is Christianity the Final Religion?, Macmillan London, England), 1922.
- Man and Deity: An Outline of the Origin and Development of Religion, W. Heffer (Cambridge, England), 1933.
- Jesus: A New Outline and Estimate, W. Heffer (Cambridge, England), 1933.
- The Doctrine of God, W. Heffer (Cambridge, England), 1934.
- (Translator) P. Erich Przywara, Przywara's Philosophy of Religion, 1935.
- (Translator) P. Erich Przywara, Polarity: A German Catholic's Interpretation of Religion, Oxford University Press (Oxford, England), 1935.
- A Lectionary of Christian Prose, Longmans, Green (New York, NY), 1939, revised and enlarged, 1965.
- Comparative Religion, Pelican (Harmondsworth, England), 1941, revised, 1971.
- Hinduism, Hutchinson (London, England), 1949, revised, 1969.
- Everyday Life in New Testament Times, B T. Batsford (London, England), 1953, revised, 1956.
- Sacred Books of the World, 1953, revised, Penguin (Harmondsworth, England), 1967.
- The Christian Faith and Non-Christian Religions, J. Nisbet, 1958, Greenwood Press (Westport, CT), 1976.
- Religious Experience: Its Nature, Types, and Validity, W. Heffer (Cambridge, England), 1968.
- European Brasses, Frederick A. Praeger (New York City), 1968.

Also author of Modern Handbooks of Religion, four Volumes. Contributor to various encyclopedias and theological publications
