= Brian Brolly =

English showbusiness entrepreneur

Brian Brolly (21 October 1936 – 28 October 2006) was an English showbusiness entrepreneur. He was the managing director of Paul and Linda McCartney's MPL Communications, and then of Andrew Lloyd Webber's Really Useful Theatre Company. He was a co-founder of the radio stations Jazz FM and Classic FM.

Brolly was born in London. His father, Tom Brolly, was born in Belfast but played football for Millwall FC and Crystal Palace FC, and played four times for Northern Ireland. Brolly was educated at St Dunstan's College, and did National Service in the Royal Ulster Rifles. He played rugby for London Irish, and worked in television from 1957. He became a vice-president of MCA Television at the age of 26. He married his wife, Gillian, in 1963. He worked on the production of films including A Countess from Hong Kong (1967) – Charlie Chaplin's last film – and the BBC television drama series Colditz (1972–74).

In 1969, Brolly encouraged Andrew Lloyd Webber and Tim Rice to develop their musical Jesus Christ Superstar (1972–80). Given the controversial topic, he encouraged them to release an album of the music first. The double album proved to be a great success, as was the musical when it opened on Broadway in 1971. He assisted Paul and Linda McCartney setting up MPL Communications in 1973, becoming its managing director. He also assisted them with the management of Wings, and produced records including Band on the Run and Mull of Kintyre.

He left MPL Communications in 1978 to become managing director of Lloyd Webber's Really Useful Group. He also took a 30% interest in the company. At RUG, he developed the West End musicals Cats (1981–2002), Starlight Express (1984–92) and The Phantom of the Opera (1986–present, as of 2006), all of which have had extended runs on Broadway and elsewhere. He sold half of his interest when RUG was floated on the stock exchange in 1986. He left in 1988, by which time RUG was producing books, television and films. Brolly took an £800,000 payoff and received £14 million from Robert Maxwell for his remaining 14% stake.

In addition to continuing to produce hit shows, such as The Importance of Being Earnest with Simon Callow, Brolly went on to start Jazz FM in 1990 and Classic FM in 1992, the latter in collaboration with GWR Group. He was also involved with the US leisure concept company LARC Inc, which designs theme parks such as Alton Towers. He set up a theatrical production firm called Producers Four with fellow entertainment mogul Michael Jenkins. In 2004, Producers Four launched the Broadway musical Brooklyn. He also invested in the Angelina Ballerina children's books and in Tim Waterstone's Daisy & Tom children's shops.

He died of a heart attack on 28 October 2006. He was survived by his wife and their two sons.
