= Philip Jones (historian) =

British medieval historian (1921–2006)

Philip James Jones, FBA, FRHistS (19 November 1921 – 26 March 2006) was a British medieval historian, known for his work on medieval and Renaissance Italy.

== Biography ==
Born in London, Jones was educated at St Dunstan's College and Wadham College, Oxford, and Magdalen College, Oxford, where he completed a DPhil under the supervision of Cecilia Ady.

He was assistant lecturer at the University of Glasgow from 1949 to 1950, lecturer at the University of Leeds from 1950 to 1961, reader at Leeds from 1961 to 1963, and fellow and tutor at Brasenose College, Oxford, from 1963 until his retirement.

Jones married Carla Marianna Rosalia Susini (died 2004), whom he had met in Italy, in 1954. They had a son and a daughter.

== Honours ==
Jones was elected to the British Academy in 1984 and received its Serena Medal for Italian studies in 1988.
