= Eric Marsh (cricketer, born 1940) =

English cricketer and educator

Personal information
- Full name: Eric Marsh
- Born: 30 May 1940; Greenwich, Kent, England
- Died: 9 November 2017 (aged 77); Oswestry, Shropshire, England
- Batting: Right-handed
- Bowling: Leg break

Domestic team information
- Years: Team
- 1962: Oxford University
- 1964–1976: Shropshire

Career statistics
Competition	First-class
Matches	10
Runs scored	419
Batting average	24.64
100s/50s	–/1
Top score	50
Catches/stumpings	4/–
- Source: Cricinfo, 10 July 2019

Eric Marsh (30 May 1940 – 9 November 2017) was an English first-class cricketer and educator.

Marsh was born at Greenwich in May 1940. He was educated at St Dunstan's College, before going up to the University of Bristol to study mathematics. From Bristol, he undertook postgraduate studies at St Edmund Hall, Oxford.

While studying at Oxford, he made his debut in first-class cricket for Oxford University against Gloucestershire at Oxford in 1962. He made nine further first-class appearances for Oxford in 1962, scoring 419 runs at an average of 24.64, with a high score of 50. In addition to playing first-class cricket, Marsh also played minor counties cricket for Shropshire from 1964–76, making 45 appearances in the Minor Counties Championship, while playing at club level for Ludlow. He also appeared in the Second XI teams of Somerset and Kent.

Marsh also played rugby and was an All England Rugby Fives champion.

After graduating from Oxford, he became a schoolteacher. He taught at Bedstone College, Dulwich College, Alleyn's School and Ellesmere College. Marsh died at Oswestry in November 2017 aged 77 and was survived by his wife, Jane.
