= Peter Snowdon =

British historian and journalist

Peter Snowdon is a contemporary historian and journalist.

Educated at St. Dunstan's College, Durham University and the London School of Economics, he has collaborated with Anthony Seldon on a number of books, including the authorised biography of John Major, Major: A Political Life (Weidenfeld & Nicolson, 1997), Blair (Simon & Schuster, 2004) and Blair Unbound (Simon & Schuster, 2007).

He has written articles on the Conservative Party in several academic journals, including The Political Quarterly and Parliamentary Affairs. He has also contributed to Parliamentary Monitor, Parliamentary Brief and Newsweek. He is an occasional columnist for the Yorkshire Post and has appeared as a commentator on television and radio in the UK and abroad. He currently works for BBC political programmes, having previously worked at London Weekend Television.

== Books and publications ==
- Author, Back from the Brink: The Extraordinary Fall and Rise of the Conservative Party (September 2010)
- Co-author, Blair Unbound with Anthony Seldon and Daniel Collings (Simon & Schuster, 2007)
- Contributor, The Blair Effect: 2001-05 (CUP, 2005)
- Contributor, Recovering Power: The Conservative Party in Opposition since 1867 (Palgrave, 2005)
- Contributor, Britain Votes 2005 (edited by Pippa Norris, OUP, 2005)
- Co-author, The Conservative Party: An Illustrated History (Sutton Publishing, 2004)
- Principal researcher, Blair (Simon & Schuster, 2004)
- Co-author, A New Conservative Century? (Centre for Policy Studies, 2001)
- Co-author, Cameron at 10 with Anthony Seldon (William Collins, 2015)
