= William Castell =

British businessman (born 1947)

Sir William Martin Castell (born 10 April 1947) is a British businessman who was chairman of the Wellcome Trust, a director of General Electric and a former director of BP. He was CEO of Amersham plc from 1989 until it was acquired by GE in April 2004 and then became CEO of GE Healthcare and a vice-chairman of GE.

Castell was educated at St. Dunstan's College and Cass Business School, where he earned a BA. He qualified as an accountant with Spicer and Pegler (1971–75) and then joined Wellcome plc as financial controller of Europe (1976–79), rising to MD Wellcome Biotech (1982–84) and commercial director (1984–89).

He was a non-executive director of The General Electric Company (UK) which became Marconi plc 1997–2002, and was appointed a non-executive director of BP in 2006, until April 2012.

He joined the board of governors of the Wellcome Trust as chairman-designate on 1 January 2006, succeeding Sir Dominic Cadbury as chairman in May 2006. Prior to joining Amersham, he held various positions with the Wellcome pharmaceutical company, which was then owned by the Wellcome Trust.

Alongside his business career he has been involved for many years in not-for-profit activities, including being a council member of the Medical Research Council (2001–2004) and chairman of the Prince's Trust (1998–2003). He is a former trustee of the Natural History Museum, a board member of the University of Michigan's Institute of Life sciences, a board member of the National Bureau of Asian Research, a visiting fellow at Green College, Oxford University, and an Honorary Fellow of the Academy of Medical Sciences.

== Sources ==
- Debrett's People of Today 2007 entry
- Wellcome Trust website
- Sustainable Development
- Infectious Diseases
