= Charles Lee (British architect) =

British architect

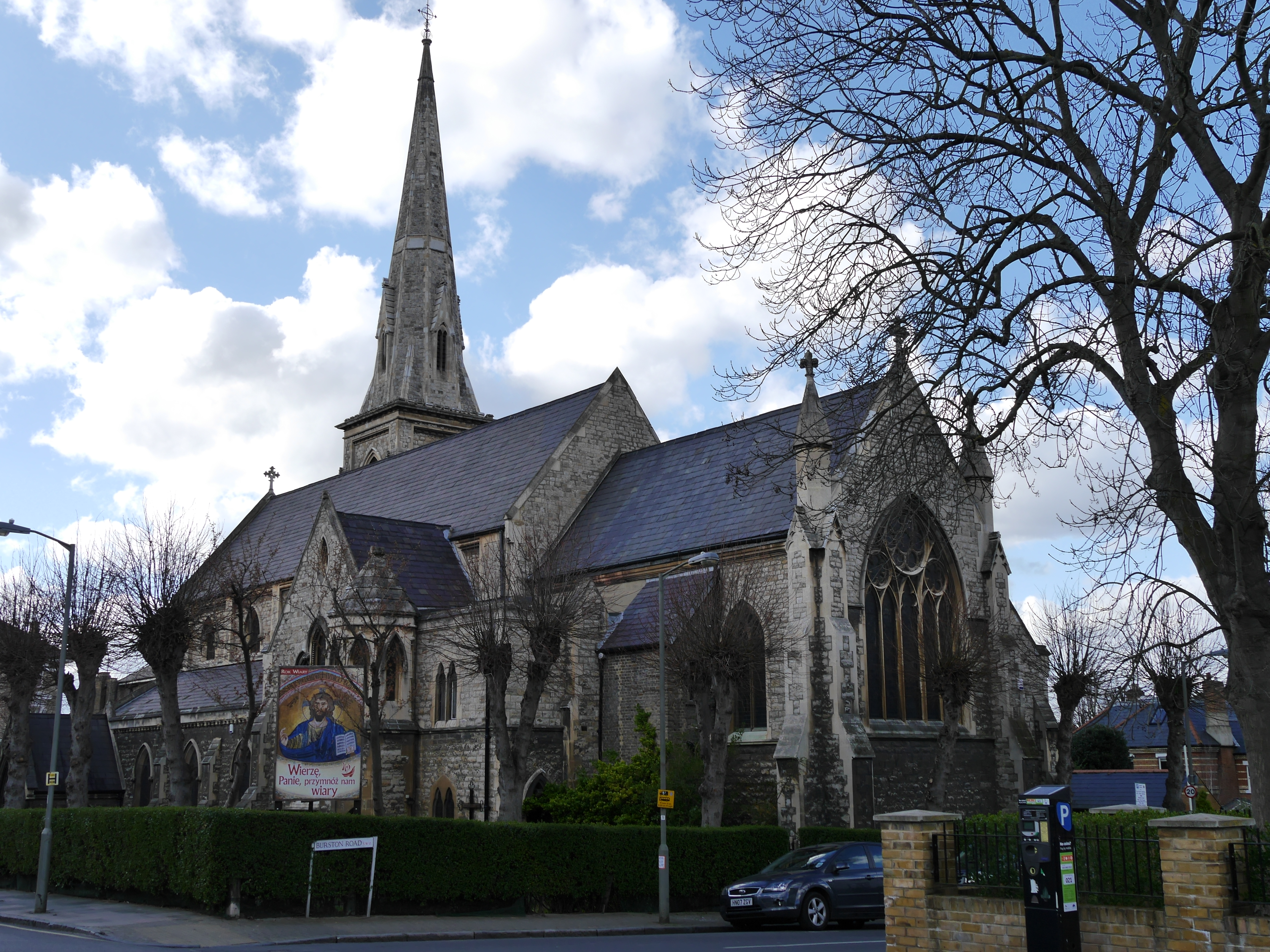
Polish Church of the Evangelist, Putney

Charles Lee FRIBA (1803/4 – 28 August 1880) was a British architect, who designed the Polish Church of the Evangelist, Putney.

He was in partnership with Thomas Talbot Bury from 1845 to 1849. In 1865, he was the architect for the rebuilding of the East India Club.

Lee died at Ravenswood, West Hill, Putney on 28 August 1880.
