= Geoffrey Nice =

British barrister

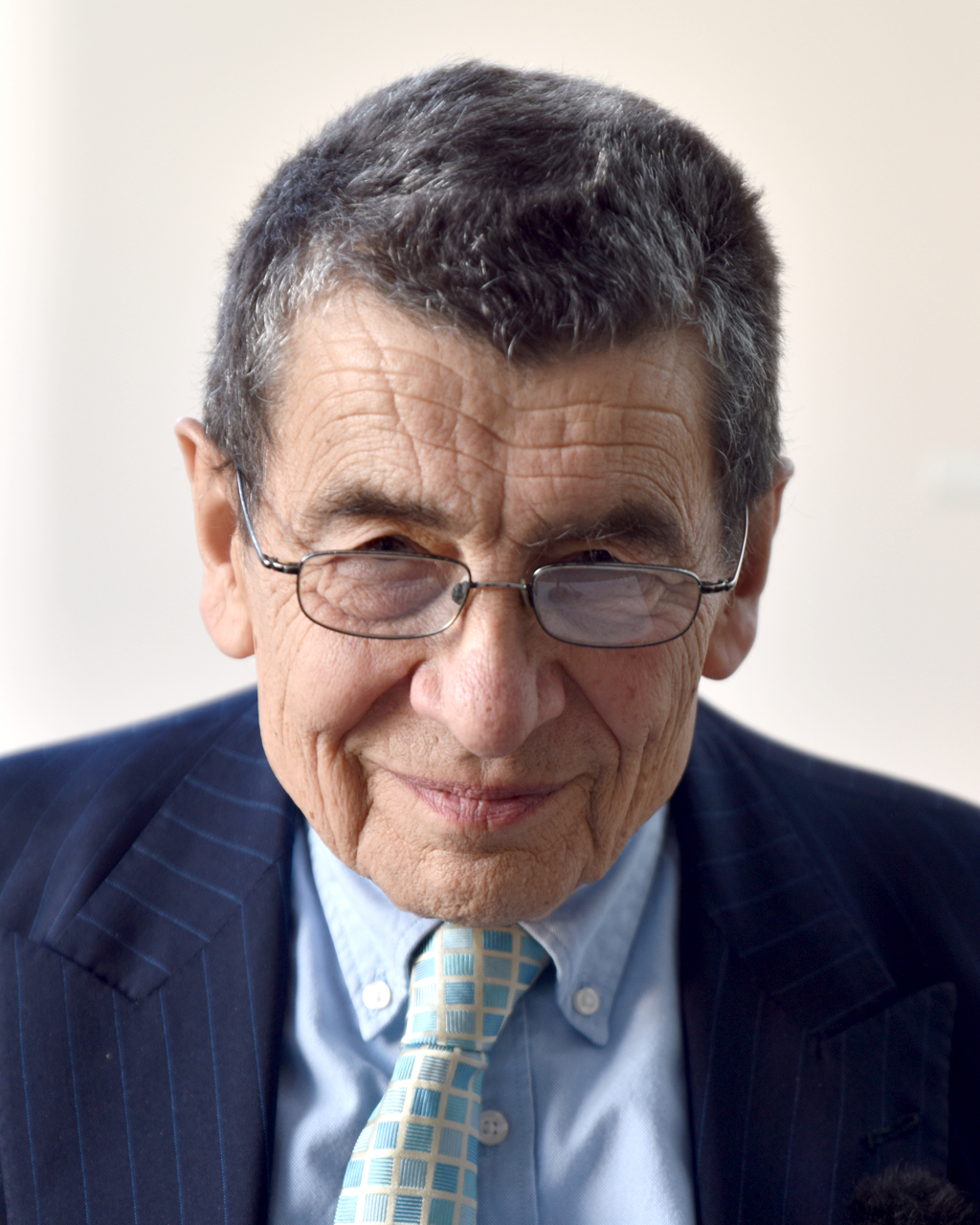
- Geoffrey Nice (2022)
- Born: 21 October 1945; London (United Kingdom)
- Education: Keble College, St Dunstan's College
- Occupations: Lawyer, barrister (1971–)
- Employer: Uyghur Tribunal (2020–2021)
- Awards: Knight Bachelor

Sir Geoffrey Nice KC (born 21 October 1945) is a British barrister and former part-time judge. In the 1983 United Kingdom general election and the 1987 United Kingdom general election, he was the unsuccessful Social Democratic Party candidate for Dover. He took part in the International Criminal Tribunal for the Former Yugoslavia and was lead prosecutor at Slobodan Milošević's 2002 trial.

Between 2009 and 2012, he was Vice-Chair of the Bar Standards Board, the body that regulates barristers in England and Wales.

In 2017, Nice published a book, "Justice for All and How to Achieve It". In 2019 he chaired the China Tribunal, an independent people’s tribunal established to inquire into forced organ harvesting from prisoners of conscience in China. In 2021 he chaired the Uyghur Tribunal, which examined evidence regarding the ongoing human rights abuses against the Uyghur people by the Government of China.

In 2005 Nice received an Honorary Doctorate of Law from the University of Kent at Canterbury, and in 2021 he received an Honorary Doctorate of Law from the University of Buckingham.

== Life and career ==
=== Early life ===
Nice's family home was in Catford, England, where he attended St Dunstan's College, and later Keble College, Oxford. He became a barrister in 1971 and was appointed Queen's Counsel in 1990. From 1984 to 2014 he was a part-time judge at the Old Bailey. Nice was made a Knight Bachelor in 2007. In 2009, he was named Vice-Chair of the Bar Standards Board. In 2012 he was appointed the Professor of Law at Gresham College, a position formerly occupied by Baroness Deech.

=== Politics ===
In the 1983 United Kingdom general election and 1987 United Kingdom general election, he was the unsuccessful Social Democratic Party candidate for Dover.

=== Prosecutor career ===
Nice has been involved with the International Criminal Tribunal for the Former Yugoslavia (ICTY). He was lead prosecutor at the 2002 trial of Slobodan Milošević in The Hague and initiated the prosecution's initial case of linking atrocities committed in the former Yugoslavia to Milosevic. His contract in that case ended in 2006. He prosecuted the ICTY cases of the Bosnian Croat Dario Kordić and the successful prosecution of Goran Jelisić. Nice has been active in the International Criminal Court (ICC) and in pro bono work for victims groups. His practice includes human rights/public law and personal injury.

In February 2009 he represented Omar al-Bashir, and tried but failed to block the ICC cases against Bashir; the ICC issued an arrest warrant for al-Bashir the following month on counts of war crimes and crimes against humanity.

In August 2010, journalist Judith Armatta published a book titled Twilight of Impunity: The War Crimes Trial of Slobodan Milosevic. In December 2010, Nice reviewed this book on London Review of Books. In his review, Nice criticized the ICTY for its decisions during the trial of Milosevic. Nice alleged that the prosecutor of the ICTY, Carla Del Ponte, had compromised with Milosevic, which then led to a failure of Bosnia-Herzegovina in their genocide case against Serbia in February 2007. In 2005, Nice cross-examined Vojislav Šešelj, the Serbian Radical Party leader, former Serbian Deputy Prime Minister, and a Hague indictee later convicted of war crimes, as a defense witness in the Milošević trial. Following their courtroom clash, Šešelj hit back by publishing a book about the prosecutor under an abusive title, with Aleksandar Vučić, then the party's secretary-general and a former President of Serbia, credited as one of its reviewers.

=== Uyghurs ===
Nice was the chair of the China Tribunal, independently initiated by the International Coalition to End Transplant Abuse in China (ETAC). The tribunal focused on the issue of forced organ harvesting from prisoners of conscience in China and delivered its Final Judgment in January 2020. Nice was asked to become the head of 2021 Uyghur Tribunal by the World Uyghur Congress to examine evidence regarding the ongoing human rights abuses against the Uyghur people by the Government of China.

In 2021, in retaliation for sanctions issued against Chinese officials by the United States, European Union and United Kingdom, the People's Republic of China issued sanctions against Nice that banned him from entering territory that the country controls or from doing business with Chinese persons. A Chinese Foreign Ministry spokesperson said in a statement that these sanctions were issued due to Nice discussing the persecution of Uyghurs in China, which the statement termed as "lies and disinformation".

=== Gaza-Israel ===
In 2015, Nice chaired a panel discussion at Gresham College on the Gaza-Israel conflict to discuss the possibility of war crimes being committed.

=== The Geoffrey Nice Foundation ===
The Geoffrey Nice Foundation was founded by Nice in 2014. It aims to promote a multidisciplinary approach to the study and teaching of International Criminal Justice and uses methodologies from law, history, sociology, political science, and international relations to address issues related to political violence and mass atrocities.

=== Judicial career ===
In 2009, a conviction Nice had presided over was ordered quashed and retried, after a Privy Council Appeal found his handling of the case had resulted in an unfair hearing. One reason that Nice was criticized by the Privy Council was for his unfair handling in the trial of a St. Helier-based accountant Peter Michel. Michel had been accused of ten counts of money laundering in 2007, and was sentenced to six years in prison.

In 2009, however, the Privy Council quashed the conviction against Michel, and said that Nice had been hostile, sarcastic, mocking, and patronising toward the defendant in an excessive number of inappropriate interventions during the trial, and that such action had rendered the trial unfair. In the same report, the Jersey Evening Post claimed that the actions could have cost the Jersey taxpayers "millions of pounds." In 2012, two members of the General Council of the Bar, Desmond Browne KC and Tim Dutton KC, challenged the Privy Council's decision to overturn the conviction against Michel.
