= Uyghur Tribunal =

Non-governmental genocide tribunal

The Uyghur Tribunal was an independent "people's tribunal" based in the United Kingdom aiming to examine evidence regarding the ongoing human rights abuses against the Uyghur people by the Government of China and to evaluate whether the abuses constitute genocide under the Genocide Convention. The tribunal was launched and chaired by Geoffrey Nice, the lead prosecutor in the trial of Slobodan Milošević, who announced the creation of the tribunal in September 2020.

According to Nice, the tribunal was called when there became "no other way of bringing the leadership of the [Chinese] Communist Party collectively or individually to judgement." China's government has said that the tribunal constitutes "blasphemy against the law", issued sanctions against the tribunal and its organizers, and called the tribunal "sheer fiction".

In December 2021, the tribunal concluded that the government of the People's Republic of China had committed genocide against the Uyghurs via birth control and sterilization measures. In addition to this, they found evidence of crimes against humanity, torture and sexual abuse. The tribunal's final determination did not individually bind any government to take action, but organizers hoped that the tribunal's hearings and reports may spur international action and help to hold China to account for its abuse of the Uyghurs.

== Background ==
The government of China has committed an ongoing series of human rights abuses against the Uyghur people and other ethnic and religious minorities in and around the Xinjiang Uygur Autonomous Region (XUAR) of the People's Republic of China that is often characterized as genocide. Since 2014, the Chinese government, led by the Chinese Communist Party (CCP) during the administration of CCP general secretary Xi Jinping, has pursued policies leading to more than one million Muslims (the majority of them Uyghurs) being held in secretive re-education camps without any legal process in what has become the largest-scale and most systematic detention of ethnic and religious minorities since the Holocaust and World War II. Thousands of mosques have been destroyed or damaged, and hundreds of thousands of children have been forcibly separated from their parents and sent to boarding schools.

In particular, critics of the Chinese government's policies have highlighted the concentration of Uyghurs in re-education camps, suppression of Uyghur religious practices, political indoctrination, severe ill-treatment, as well as extensive evidence and other testimonials detailing human rights abuses including forced sterilization, contraception, and abortions. Critics have described these as constituting the forced assimilation of Xinjiang, as well as an ethnocide or cultural genocide. Some governments, activists, independent NGOs, human rights experts, academics, government officials, and the East Turkistan Government-in-Exile have called it a genocide.

International reactions have been sharply divided, with dozens of United Nations (UN) member states issuing opposing letters to the United Nations Human Rights Council in support and condemnation of China's policies in Xinjiang in 2020. In December 2020, the International Criminal Court declined to take investigative action against China on the basis of not having jurisdiction over China for most of the alleged crimes. The United States, Canada's House of Commons, the Dutch parliament, the United Kingdom's House of Commons, the Seimas of Lithuania, and Senate of the Czech Republic have recognized the treatment of Uyghurs in China as genocide.

== Creation of the tribunal ==
Geoffrey Nice, the prosecutor in the war crimes trial of Slobodan Milošević, launched the Uyghur tribunal in September 2020. The tribunal was set up in response to a June 2020 request from the World Uyghur Congress, which provided the initial evidence to the tribunal. A call for evidence was put out at the time of the tribunal's announcement.

By February 2020 the tribunal's jury had been finalized; the tribunal's jury is composed of human rights experts and lawyers.

=== Invitation of witnesses ===
One dozen experts have been invited to the hearings to present evidence, including academics such as anthropologist Darren Byler, Reader in Chinese Studies Joanne Smith Finley, researcher Nathan Ruser, and researcher Adrian Zenz. Others who will present evidence include World Uyghur Congress President Dolkun Isa, Uyghur scholar Adbuweli Ayup, and witnesses to the Xinjiang re-education camps that include former detainees.

Organizers of the Uyghur Tribunal say that China was invited to present evidence, though the Chinese government has not done so.

== Hearings ==
The Uyghur Tribunal began its first series of hearings in June 2021, with a second set of hearings scheduled for September 2021.

=== Testimonies ===
During hearings held in June 2021, witness testimonies described observing or experiencing mass torture, rape (including gang rape), forced sterilization, forced abortion, forced administration of medications that stopped women from menstruating, arbitrary arrest and detention, mass surveillance, intimidation by government officials, and forced child separation, and allegations of Infanticide. Evidence presented also included testimony of sexual harassment of women by Chinese agents, retaliation by the Chinese government against relatives of Uyghurs living abroad, the physical destruction of homes with families that "had more births than allowed", and other abuses.

China denies that it has committed human rights abuses within Xinjiang, including within the Xinjiang re-education camps, and disputes the legitimacy of the testimonies.

The Uyghur Tribunal held a virtual third hearing on 27 November 2021.

== Judgment ==
According to the tribunal's website, the finding of genocide "would constitute the commission of Genocide as defined in Article 2 of the Convention of 1948 to which the PRC is a signatory and ratifying state. Acts arising from or incidental to the prohibited acts of Genocide, may also in themselves constitute crimes against humanity."

On 9 December 2021, the tribunal concluded that the government of the People's Republic of China had committed genocide against the Uyghurs via birth control and sterilization measures. Additionally, they found evidence of crimes against humanity, torture and sexual abuse.

== Reactions ==
=== Countries ===
==== Australia ====
Australia offered to provide the Uyghur Tribunal with relevant evidence, according to the Tribunal's counsel.

==== China ====
The Chinese government launched an aggressive public relations campaign against the Uyghur Tribunal. The government issued sanctions against the tribunal and its organizers, while its spokesmen have said that the tribunal is "blasphemy against the law" and "sheer fiction" with paid actors. The sanctions were condemned by the British Prime Minister and led the British Foreign Secretary to summon the Chinese ambassador.

According to the tribunal's representatives, China was invited to present evidence, but has not done so.

==== United Kingdom ====
UK Asia Minister Nigel Adams declined to formally provide government evidence to the Uyghur Tribunal, but met with the chair of the tribunal in April 2021.

==== United States ====
The United States offered to provide the Uyghur Tribunal with relevant evidence, according to the tribunal's counsel.

=== Non-governmental organizations ===
==== Human rights groups ====
Luke de Pulford, the co-founder of the Coalition for Genocide Response, wrote in ITV News that the tribunal was of "global significance." He wrote that, in the absence of the ability of an international court to analyze the case owing to China's veto power on the United Nations Security Council, that the tribunal would serve "to ensure the Genocide Convention does not become a meaningless document."

==== Uyghur groups ====
Dolkun Isa, President of the World Uyghur Congress, told Radio Free Asia after the first day of hearings that "[t]he Uyghur Tribunal hearing has gone extremely well today in spite of China's disinformation campaign and diplomatic threats against tribunal, camp survivors and witnesses."
