= Frederick Henry Johnson =

- Born: 15 August 1890; Streatham, London, England
- Died: 26 November 1917 (aged 27); Bourlon Wood, France
- Burial place: Remembered on the Cambrai Memorial
- Military career
- Allegiance: United Kingdom
- Branch: British Army
- Service years: 1914–1917
- Rank: Major
- Unit: Royal Engineers
- Conflicts: World War I: Western Front; Battle of Loos; Battle of Cambrai; Battle of Bourlon Wood †
- Awards: Victoria Cross

Frederick Henry Johnson VC (15 August 1890 – 26 November 1917) was a British soldier and recipient of the Victoria Cross, the highest and most prestigious award for gallantry in the face of the enemy that can be awarded to British and Commonwealth forces.

== Details ==
An Old Boy of Whitgift Middle School (Croydon), now Trinity School of John Whitgift, St Dunstan's College (Catford) and Battersea Polytechnic, Johnson was commissioned in 1914 as a Second Lieutenant in the 73rd Field Coy., Corps of Royal Engineers, British Army. He was 25 years old, on 25 September 1915 during the attack on Hill 70 in the Battle of Loos, when he performed an act of bravery for which he was awarded the Victoria Cross.

For most conspicuous bravery and devotion to duty in the attack on Hill 70 on 25 September 1915. Second Lieutenant Johnson was with a section of his company of the Royal Engineers. Although wounded in the leg, he stuck to his duty throughout the attack, led several charges on the German redoubt, and at a very critical time, under very heavy fire, repeatedly rallied the men who were near him. By his splendid example and cool courage he was mainly instrumental in saving the situation and in establishing firmly his part of the position which had been taken. He remained at his post until relieved in the evening.

— The London Gazette, 16 November 1915

He later achieved the rank of Major and was killed in action whilst commanding 231st Field Coy. Royal Engineers in Bourlon Wood, France, on 26 November 1917 and is commemorated on the Cambrai Memorial to the Missing.

== The medal ==
Johnson's medal is privately owned.

== Bibliography ==
- Harvey, David (2000). Monuments to Courage. Naval & Military Press Ltd. ISBN 1-84342-356-1.
- Buzzell, Nora, ed. (1997). The Register of the Victoria Cross. Cheltenham, Gloucestershire: This England Alma House. ISBN 0-906324-27-0.
- Napier, Gerald (1998). The Sapper VCs: The Story of Valour in the Royal Engineers and Its Associated Corps. The Stationery Office. ISBN 978-0117728356.
- Batchelor, Peter; Matson, Christopher (2011). The Western Front 1915. VCs of the First World War. Stroud, Gloucestershire: The History Press. ISBN 978-0-7524-6057-4.
