= Philip Conisbee =

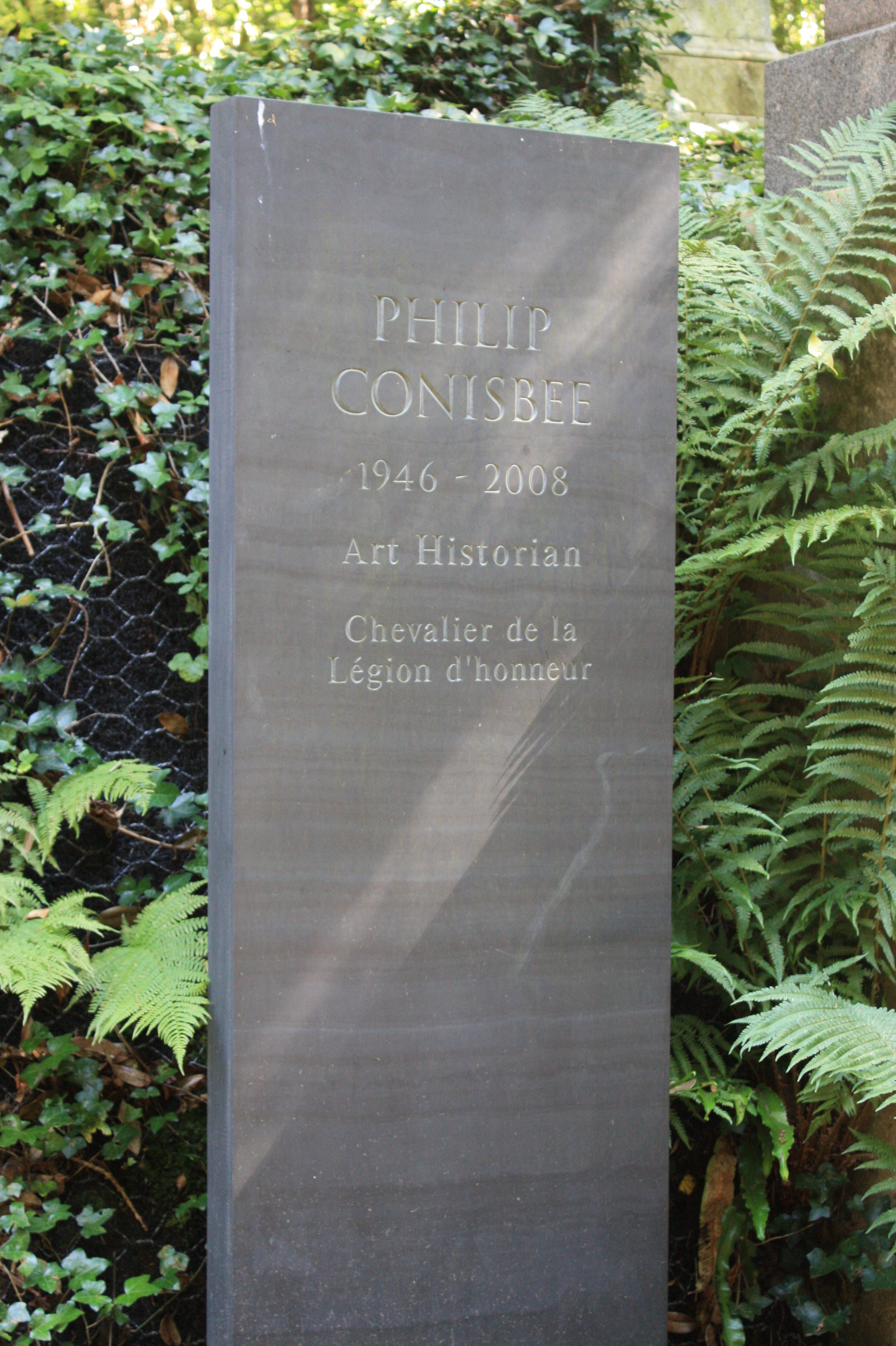
The grave of Philip Conisbee, Highgate Cemetery, London

Philip Conisbee (January 3, 1946 – January 16, 2008) was a British-American curator for the American National Gallery of Art.

== Life ==
Philip was born in Belfast, the son of Paul Conisbee, but raised in London, being educated at St Dunstan's College in Catford before earning a BA in European Art at the Courtauld Institute in 1968.

Continuing in academia, he received a doctorate for his thesis on the French landscape artist Claude Joseph Vernet in 1971. From 1971 to 1986, he lectured at Leicester University. He then moved to America to act as Curator of French Art at the Museum of Fine Arts in Boston.

He befriended Earl Powell III and moved to California to work with him at the Los Angeles County Museum of Art in 1988. Powell moved to Washington in 1992 and asked Conisbee to join him the following year.

He became a US citizen in 1994.

He rose to be Curator of the National Gallery of Art in Washington D.C. In 1998, he organised one of the country's most successful exhibitions: Van Gogh's Van Goghs.

In 2003, the French government awarded him Chevalier de la Legion d'Honneur.

He died of lung cancer in Georgetown, Washington D.C., but is buried in Highgate Cemetery in north London.

== Family ==
Conisbee first married Susan Baer, with whom he had two children, Ben and Molly. He later married Faya Causey, who survived him.

== Selected publications ==
- Chardin (1985)
- Painting in 18th-Century France (1981)
- In the Light of Italy: Corot and Early Open-Air Painting (1996)
- George de la Tour and his World (1996)
- Portraits by Ingres: Image of an Epoch (1999)
- Cézanne in Provence (2006)
