= William Boon =

British chemist

William Robert Boon
- Born: 20 March 1911; Catford
- Died: 28 October 1994 (aged 83)
- Education: King's College London
- Known for: Paraquat
- Awards: Mullard Award (1972); FRS (1974)

William Robert Boon FRS FRSC (20 March 1911 – 28 October 1994) was a British chemist, known for developing the herbicide paraquat.

== Early life ==
William Boon (Bill) was the only child of Walter Boon and Ellen Catherine (née Medhurst). After attending two private schools he entered St Dunstan's College. His chemistry master [there] (W Anderson) persuaded his father to let him stay at school and aim for a university education. He was accepted by King's College London and gained an honours degree in chemistry in 1932, followed by a PhD in biochemistry in 1936.

== Career ==
=== ICI ===
Boon's scientific career is thoroughly described in the Royal Society Memoir. The highlights of his time at ICI are:

- In 1936 Boon was one of 6 PhDs in the Dyestuffs Division of ICI. His first job was to explore variations of Nikethamide which are less toxic. Some were found but the project was dropped. He then successfully studied how to scale up production of Mepacrine.
- In 1942 he took charge of a section concerned with the production, purification and structure of penicillin. Successful collaboration with Pfizer and other firms was achieved. In addition, much purer penicillin was produced by chromatography.
- Alongside observations made at ICI's Jealott's Hill research station, as many quaternary ammonium compounds as possible from the Dyestuffs collection were tested for herbicidal activity. One them (now known as diquat) was very successful. Further research on related compounds revealed a second dipyridilium herbicide, which was given the name paraquat. And through Boon's efforts ICI (now Zeneca) was persuaded to scale up its production, which proved no easy task.

=== Awards ===
He was awarded the Mullard Award of the Royal Society in 1972 and was made a Fellow of the Royal Society in 1974. He was also a Fellow of the Royal Society of Chemistry and a Fellow of King's College London.

== Private life ==
In 1938 Bill married Marjorie Betty Oury, a fellow graduate of King's. They had 3 children: Sally (1939), Michael Robert (1942) and Heather Mary (1948).

Boon had various hobbies and interests. He was an accomplished linguist, photographer and cabinet maker. He made items of furniture for his and Betty’s home and for those of their three children when they married. He also made an altar table for his local parish church. He shared with his wife an interest in music, opera and ballet.

Wiiliam Robert Boom died in Oxford following a long period of illness. He was survived by his wife, son and two daughters.
