= Tom Brolly =

Northern Irish footballer (1912–1986)

Personal information
- Full name: Thomas Henry Brolly
- Date of birth: 1 June 1912
- Place of birth: Belfast, Northern Ireland
- Date of death: June 1986 (aged 74)
- Place of death: Sutton, England
- Position: Half-back

Senior career*
Years	Team	Apps	(Gls)
1931–1933	Crusaders		
1932–1933	Glenavon		
1933–1935	Sheffield Wednesday	2	(0)
1935–1940	Millwall	133	(7)
1945–1950	Millwall	98	(1)
Total		233	(8)

International career
1937–1939	Northern Ireland	4	(0)
- * Club domestic league appearances and goals

Thomas Henry Brolly (1 June 1912 – June 1986) was a Northern Irish international footballer who played as a half-back. He spent the majority of his career at Millwall, making a total of 263 appearances and scoring 11 goals in all competitions. He spent two spells with Millwall, fighting in World War II in between. Brolly won the Football League Third Division South championship with Millwall in 1938, and reached the FA Cup semi-final in the same season. . He was capped four times for Northern Ireland, playing in two games against Wales in 1937 and 1938 and against England and Wales in 1939. Later in his career he was a trainer at Crystal Palace, Chelmsford City, and at Ipswich Town with Bobby Robson. Brolly was nicknamed "The Professor" while coaching at the Robert Browning Institute in Walworth.
