= List of A Haunting episodes =

The following is an episode listing of the television program A Haunting for the Discovery Channel, Destination America, TLC Network and Travel Channel, with the original air dates for the episodes included.

== Series overview ==
Season	Episodes	Originally released		
Season	Episodes	First released	Last released	Network
Specials	2	August 6, 2002	September 18, 2002	Discovery Channel
1	8	October 28, 2005	March 24, 2006	Discovery Channel
2	8	August 10, 2006	September 28, 2006	Discovery Channel
3	10	October 5, 2006	December 14, 2006	Discovery Channel
4	13	August 10, 2007	November 9, 2007	Discovery Channel
5	10	October 12, 2012	December 16, 2012	Destination America
6	4	September 29, 2013	October 20, 2013	Destination America
7	16	August 1, 2014	January 23, 2015	Destination America
8	10	January 3, 2016	March 20, 2016	Destination America
9	16	October 21, 2016	October 30, 2017	TLC
10	10	May 27, 2019	July 29, 2019	Travel Channel
11	10	December 31, 2021	March 4, 2022	Travel Channel

== Episodes ==
=== Specials (2002) ===
No.	Title	Original release date
Special–1	"A Haunting in Connecticut"	August 6, 2002
In 1986, Ed and Karen Parker move with their four children, Bobby, Paul, Connie, and Mark, into an old Connecticut home to be near the hospital where their teenage son, Paul, receives cancer treatment. Soon after learning that their residence was once a funeral home, sons Paul and Bobby start seeing ghosts. Paul begins seeing evil entities, including four dark men and a demon called the "Man in the Suit", and his mental health worsens while his physical health begins to improve. Paul begins to spend more time alone and his behavior becomes violent and unpredictable. He writes dark, sinister poetry and even physically attacks his favorite cousin, Theresa. With his behavior becoming increasingly erratic, his parents have him committed to a mental hospital. Before his departure, Paul warns his family that once he is out of the house, evil will begin to attack everyone else. Sure enough, once Paul is gone, the evil forces inhabiting the house turn onto the rest of the family. In desperation, the Parkers contact psychic investigators Ed and Lorraine Warren for help. An exorcism is performed which banishes the demon from the house. Despite the exorcism and the demonic activity gone from the house for good, the family moves out and never returns. Note: This story was the basis of the 2009 film The Haunting in Connecticut.
Special–2	"A Haunting in Georgia"	September 18, 2002
In 1988, the Wyrick family moved into a new home, which was mysteriously abandoned by the previous owners. Shortly afterward, their four-year-old daughter Heidi begins spending time with an imaginary friend, a kindly old man named Mr. Gordy. Several months later, Heidi is frightened by the appearance of a man at the front door. The man, whose hand is wrapped in bandages and whose shirt is covered in blood, introduces himself as "Con"; but upon investigation, Heidi's mother is unable to find Con and she dismisses him as a figment of Heidi's imagination. However, Heidi begins to see images of "the Dark Figure", a man whose face is obscured by a hood. The family believes that there's more to the Dark Figure than just a child's active imagination after Heidi awakens one night with claw marks on her face. Shortly after this incident, her father Andy suffers the same scratches on his side. The entire family soon grows to fear the Dark Figure, although, for a long time, Heidi is the only family member who ever actually sees him. Note: The story was the basis of the 2013 film The Haunting in Connecticut 2: Ghosts of Georgia.

=== Season 1 (2005–06) ===
No. overall	No. in season	Title	Original release date	Prod. code
1	1	"Hell House"	October 28, 2005	103
The Beckwith family shifts into a 19th century house at 89 Buckingham Road, in Seymour, Connecticut. All the family members are excited except for their oldest daughter who foresees a terrible premonition. Shortly after they moved in, they had several ghostly experiences that they call Ed and Lorraine Warren. They get to know that their house is haunted by an inhuman spirit that controls multiple spirits. After several exorcisms, the family finally gets rid of the entities. After several years, however, some developers find Eansketambawg burials near the house, leading the hauntings to start again. Nevertheless, the family who is still living in the house knows how to deal with it now.
2	2	"The Haunting of Summerwind"	November 4, 2005	102
In the late 1960s and the early 1970s, the Summerwind Mansion lies on the shores of West Bay Lake, Wisconsin. Arnold and Ginger Hinshaw, as well as their children, move into the mansion but begin to experience unexplainable phenomena. Their lives are further complicated when Arnold becomes increasingly hostile and insane. The remaining family members are forced to leave the estate but return years later to search for the truth.
3	3	"Echoes from the Grave"	November 11, 2005	105
In 1965, Ron and Nancy Stallings move into a spacious, older Baltimore house with their large brood. They think nothing of all the windows having been nailed shut, or that the seller says, "I hope you're good fighters." They are simply happy to have a home at an unusually low price. They soon understand the seller's fighting comment as the lights and faucets turn themselves on and off and objects move themselves around. Nancy becomes genuinely alarmed following a dream featuring an elderly woman who cackles with delight as her family tries to escape the burning house. Only with the help of a trans-medium and Nancy's brother doing some research on the house's past did the family learn the truth of the old woman's past life as a slave owner and the previous owners before them had one or more family members die. Learning this, the family moves out of the house and never comes back.
4	4	"Cursed"	November 18, 2005	104
Drawn to an abandoned home in Tucson, Arizona's Silvercroft neighborhood, Romie feels like she was always meant to be there. However, nightmares and reality merge, threatening her sanity and posing the fearful possibility of making contact with the other world. When a psychic, Amy Allan, goes over to investigate the house, she discovers the haunting is connected to Romie herself and causing her to confess the truth. The psychic tells her that in order to deal with it, she must face her plaguing family issues in the form of a dark spirit by seeking help from a licensed psychiatrist. Note: Amy Allan first appeared in this episode six years before she began the Dead Files on September 23, 2011.
5	5	"Darkness Follows"	December 2, 2005	106
Al, Kellie and her young daughter are drawn to a renovated Montreal townhouse. Soon after moving in, supernatural events begin with unseen footsteps being heard and the sighting of a young woman. While Al is fascinated by the phenomena, Kellie is becoming increasingly terrified. Determined to explain the events, Al and two friends, Richard, a paranormal investigator, and John, a clairvoyant, use a pendulum and makeshift Ouija board to contact the spirits. They learn that the house is not only haunted by a distraught young woman but also by the man who had murdered her following a botched abortion. The men become convinced that the key to the haunting lies buried in the basement.
6	6	"Lake Club Horror"	December 9, 2005	101
Bill and Tom buy a former dance hall in Springfield, Illinois, and, after much renovation, reopen it as a live rock 'n roll club. The customers in 1974 love the historic place but the staffers feel differently. Music seems to emanate from nowhere and chilling blasts of air frighten the owners and crew after hours. One bartender has direct contact with a threatening spirit that informs her that one of the owners is soon going to die. Through old photographs, she identifies him as a troubled former bartender who had committed suicide on the premises. Hence they call in a local psychic to help convince the bartender to cross over.
7	7	"Gateway to Hell"	March 17, 2006	107
Country musician Bobby Mackey starts his own nightclub called Bobby Mackey's Music World in an old and abandoned slaughterhouse in Wilder, Kentucky. When Bobby's wife Janet and his employee Carl are attacked by a ghost, Bobby is skeptical about the incident at first. He soon has second thoughts when his friend Doug Hensley brings up some information regarding two male murderers who killed a woman, who was pregnant, and one of the murderers' girlfriends, and her remains were buried in the basement of the building.
8	8	"The Diabolical"	March 24, 2006	108
Marie Potter, a single mother, lives with her mentally handicapped daughter, Julie, who possesses the ability to communicate with spirits. When odd occurrences begin to disturb the family, Marie's boyfriend begins using a Ouija board to contact spirits. The board inadvertently opens a connection to a demonic entity under the alias "Frank", who begins to torment the family. Despite destroying the Ouija board, the entity continues to torment them. Marie has nightmares of Frank, who is dressed in a black suit and talks with a deep, demonic voice. He says that Marie will no longer be able to protect Julie and that she is his. He also possesses Marie's boyfriend, through which he confirms that he exists and that Julie is still no longer safe. The family contacts demonologist Dave Considine, who comes to the house along with his research team and a psychic. Throughout the days, they carry out research in the house, and conclude that there is a diabolical spirit in the home, who is using Julie as a pathway to the physical world, and uses the visions and nightmares of the little boy and Frank in order to manipulate the family. The Catholic Church is contacted, and a minor exorcism is done, banishing the demonic spirit. The episode ends with the narrator noting that the family later moved out from their home and that the other evil entities still attempt to enter their lives.

=== Season 2 (2006) ===
No. overall	No. in season	Title	Original release date	Prod. code
9	1	"Demon Child"	August 10, 2006	201
In Western Kentucky, Jan and Dale Foster's six-year-old son Cody starts talking to an imaginary playmate, whom he names "Man". As the weeks progress, Cody's behavior becomes very bad. At the start, Jan and Dale believes that Cody has an imaginary friend; however, his sudden outbursts make Jan wonder if his new behavior is related to his new "friend". Cody eventually tells his parents that Man, a six-year-old boy, was kidnapped and tortured, and called for his mother for help but she never came. Jan believes that her son has befriended the ghost of a murdered child but Dale is not convinced, believing Cody simply heard the story somewhere and is repeating it. Jan contacts a Native American shaman to rid her house of the spirit. It seemingly works, but after three months, Cody's behavior changes again drastically. Finally, one night, Jan had enough and investigates Cody's room, hoping to confront Man and see what Cody has been going through. The spirit emerges as a monstrous-looking man and attacks her. All along, Man was a demon who manifested itself as a little boy, gradually wearing Cody down in hopes of possessing him. By then Dale is more concerned for Cody's life after seeing what Jan went through. Another night, while the rest of the family sleep, she is absolutely disturbed to see the true identity of Cody's playmate and decided to call upon Higher Power. The next day, after her family left, she contacts the Native American shaman once more, wanting to carry out another cleansing, this time targeted to get rid of Man for good. During the cleansing and calling to Higher Power again, Jan is constantly tormented by the demon, but she ultimately manages to banish it back to Hell, and life in the home returns to normal. Despite the successful cleansing, Jan is still on edge knowing one day Man would return for revenge against her.
10	2	"Sallie's House"	August 17, 2006	202
An Atchison, Kansas, couple, Tony and Debra Pickman, move into their first home together. They are expecting their first child and soon after the baby's birth, strange occurrences begin to happen around the house. The couple soon learn that their house is haunted by the ghost of a seven-year-old girl named Sallie who is trying to warn them of an evil spirit lurking in the shadows. With the help of a professional paranormal researcher and psychic, the couple soon discovers the evil spirit that Sallie had been warning them about had been her mother. While outside, the mother explains to the psychic that she was a former slave and found employment in the doctor's (Sallie's father) home as a housemaid. They had an affair which lead to Sallie's birth. When Sallie was 7, her mother had ordered her to stay hidden from the doctor's immediate family so no one got suspicious. She was very angry at Sallie for disobeying her orders by running down the stairs which led to the guests finding out about their secret family. When Tony is attacked again by Sallie's mother, the couple moves away. The psychic believed Sallie's mother had attacked Tony and not Debra because she was punishing him for not accepting Sallie.
11	3	"Ghost Soldier"	August 24, 2006	205
Lisa Wilson, a single mother, finds a photograph of a soldier named Michael in her home. Michael is the brother of her ex-boyfriend who was killed in the Vietnam War, and she soon becomes obsessed with a man she has never met. When her two young daughters see Michael in their bedroom late one night, Lisa realizes that Michael is haunting her house. Another terrifying clue unearths when her radio emits, instead of music, a military distress call saying they are in an ambush, which Lisa concludes to be the battle Michael died in. To make matters worse, it soon becomes clear that there is also an evil entity in the house, which strikes by copying Michael's actions. After several terrifying events, Lisa begins to believe that Michael is trying to protect her and her daughters. Lisa seeks help from a psychic to put Michael's soul to rest and drive out the evil entity once and for all.
12	4	"Where Demons Dwell"	August 31, 2006	204
In 1980, Debbie Glatzel and Arne Cheyenne Johnson move into a new home in Connecticut. When Debbie's 12-year-old brother David helps them with the move, he becomes the target of a demon and begins to strike at David and cause harm to the other family members. The situation gets worse as the demon would then possess David for short periods of time. The family runs to a priest and paranormal investigators for help to save David and their home. Note: This episode makes no references to the Trial of Arne Cheyenne Johnson (aka The Demon Murder Trial) for the killing of his landlord Alan Bono, whom Johnson claimed he killed while under demonic possession. At his trial, Johnson's defense unsuccessfully tried to enter a plea of not guilty by demonic possession, which the presiding judge rejected and the defense alternatively choose to imply Johnson was acting in self-defense. Johnson was convicted of 1st-degree manslaughter and sentenced to 10–20 years in prison, though he served only five.
13	5	"House of the Dead"	September 7, 2006	206
In Glen Burnie, Maryland in 1970, 7-year old Billy Bean has gone through the worst moment of his childhood that he would never forget. In 1970, the Bean family moved into a new home. His parents are Patricia and Bill, and his siblings are his older teenage sister Patty and younger brother Bobby. After a while, a series of supernatural incidents start to plague the family. After a couple years, Patty gets married and moves out of the house. Billy's father becomes an abusive alcoholic and also removes himself from the house after a conflict with Patricia, leaving her to care for Billy and Bobby. As life in the house continues to unravel, Patricia begins to lose her sanity and becomes the focus of physical attacks by the entity haunting the house, even finding herself being strangled at night. After this, Billy and his family leaves the house. Years later, Billy finds some answers to the ghost who tormented his family from an investigator.
14	6	"Hungry Ghosts"	September 14, 2006	203
A wealthy American family, the Bishops, move into a luxurious mansion in the Yangming mountains of Taiwan. Everyone is happy except the older daughter who foresees a terrible premonition. Soon, strange events begin to plague various family members in their new home. Candice sees lights out of the corner of her eye; the husband and younger daughter hear voices and footsteps. They finally give up their disbelief in ghosts when their youngest daughter is attacked. The family consults a Taoist priest who says, according to Feng Shui, their house was physically designed to give power to spirits from beyond. They are told to offer the spirits food and money to appease them. Despite this, the priest also forewarns a terrible tragedy if they don't move from the home at once. This finally convinces the Bishops to move out of the house.
15	7	"Dark Forest"	September 21, 2006	207
In the mid-1970s, Clara Dandy and her family move into a farmhouse in Hinsdale, New York on the country side. When it becomes clear to them that their house is haunted by several spirits, they call a psychic who informs them that many people have died in and around the house in the last century. It is up to the family to see if they will be able to rid their home of these spirits.
16	8	"A Haunting in Florida"	September 28, 2006	208
Edd and Beth Dunnam find themselves what they believe to be the perfect home in Deltona, Florida. They are also expecting a child together who will be born in a few months. Within days, Beth begins to feel down whenever she is by herself. After several paranormal sightings, the couple realizes that something is haunting their house. Edd tries reacting angrily at the spirits in an attempt to scare them away, but little does he realize that his anger is only giving them more to feed on. When he finally realizes this and seeks help from a paranormal research group, they discover more than what the Dunnams bargained for.

=== Season 3 (2006) ===
No. overall	No. in season	Title	Original release date	Prod. code
17	1	"Fear House"	October 5, 2006	301
In Union, Missouri, single father Steven LaChance and his three kids move into a nice big house. When they become face-to-face with the supernatural, this causes them to move out. Not too long after, Steven cannot keep his mind off the property whenever he sleeps at night. In the meantime, another family has moved into the house and come across the same noises and haunting that the LaChances had to face. Steven comes to their rescue to help them before the evil that inhabits there causes any more trouble.
18	2	"The Attic"	October 12, 2006	302
In southeastern Michigan, Selena Warner relocates into a new home where she is also able to find a new job in the meantime. Not too long later, she learns that her home is haunted by a man who died there tragically many years back. Selena and her sister believe that the ghost of the man is no danger to them, but when they are convinced that there is something evil in the house as well, they learn that there is indeed a more malevolent spirit residing there besides the ghost of the man.
19	3	"Hidden Terror"	October 19, 2006	303
Mike Speranza and his girlfriend Lisa both move into a new home together in Corning, New York. The place is soon discovered to be haunted, with Lisa finding herself in constant great sorrow and depression that she is unable to get herself out of. Michael hears footsteps through the house and starts seeing the ghostly entities causing them. The spirits in the house become more threatening, resulting in the couple's relationship going downhill. After Lisa leaves, Michael must decide whether he is going to fight to save his home or leave. Only after a paranormal research team in Corning makes contact with the spirits do they discover that Mike is in danger from a malevolent male spirit and he is finally convinced to move away. Afterward, the researchers theorized why he was the target of the attacks and not Lisa along with his female friend: as the male spirit had a fondness for female companionship, he thought Mike was a rival male who stood in his way and thus attacked him. Mike's former home was sold to another couple.
20	4	"The Unleashed"	October 26, 2006	304
In 1974, Randy Ervin moves into the house in Standish, Michigan, which his father has been renovating. His father discovers some Indian burials in the basement. They are recommended to be buried again and they soon are. Randy's grown interest in paranormal forces him to buy a book of witchcraft. He tries it but nothing happens. Little did he know that he has unleashed some malevolent spirits. His mother and little sister move in to live with him. Several supernatural occurrences happen, and after Randy's mother has been attacked physically, they move out only to be followed by the spirits. The spirits start tormenting Randy. He is suggested to go to a lady who calms people tormented by spirits. The lady tells Randy to say the name of Jesus, but he is not able to. The spirits attack Randy, possess him, and push him against a wall, intending to kill him. The lady calms the spirits down by showing a crucifix. She suggests Randy and his family go and pray at his previous house. The family gets rid of the spirits for good.
21	5	"A Haunting in Ireland"	November 2, 2006	305
In Galway, Ireland, three generations of the Fahey family share a home together that has been in the family for thirty years. When Martha Fahey gives birth to a baby girl in 1996, the family finds themselves cursed by strange noises, flying objects, exploding ornaments, and mysterious orbs that are soon witnessed by neighbors, friends, and family members. The Faheys fight to protect their home and are forced to call in a priest for help, but to no avail. They call in psychic Sandra Ramdhanie who performs a healing ceremony in the house. The haunting spirit turns out to be that of a baby born to a young girl who was suffocated to death by the girl's father as she was not married. Sandra's healing comes to a success and the home is cleansed of the spirit once and for all.
22	6	"The Forgotten"	November 9, 2006	306
In 2003, April James, her two sons and her fiancé Matt Brody all move into a 100-year-old home in one of Salt Lake City's charming historic districts. Matt works as a contractor and takes the opportunity to renovate the house. Unaware to the family's knowledge, the house is actually haunted. It is not until Matt comes across a very mysterious part of the house while renovating that supernatural occurrences begin to erupt and the family find themselves plagued with several ghosts. They turn out to be the spirits of several children held captive by the spirit of an evil man. When April and Matt try to fight the evil spirit, things get ugly and the family is forced to leave the house. Their only hope is a gifted psychic who uncovers the house's dark secret regarding the man when he was alive.
23	7	"The Wheatsheaf Horror"	November 16, 2006	307
In northeastern England, the staff of the Wheatsheaf Pub, a century-old bar, soon learns that the place is haunted by the spirit of a little girl named Jessica who was killed by a man named Joseph. The current bartender and the Pub owners try to contact the girl on a Ouija board, but end up conjuring the ghost of the girl's killer instead. The staff must now work together with the two psychic mediums to save themselves and the spirit of the young girl from the ghost killer's wrath. However, when a recording of Joseph is caught threatening the life of Suzanne for her interference, it makes her more determined to save Jessica. When one of the regulars gets possessed by Joseph, the need to save him and themselves becomes more important. During the prayer fight between the owners, medium, and the regular possessed by Joseph, the truth of how Jessica died comes to light.
24	8	"The Possessed"	November 30, 2006	308
Paranormal investigator Mary Vogel finds herself coming across demonic forces while investigating a case. She experiences strange nightmares whenever she sleeps at night and finds her body attacked by ghosts during the day. Mary soon goes to her mentor, John Zaffis, one of the world's leading paranormal experts, to get rid of the demon from trying to take over Mary's body. During the exorcism, Zaffis uncovers the shocking identity of the demon who was possessing Mary.
25	9	"The Presence"	December 7, 2006	309
Sarah Miller, her boyfriend, and her children have moved into a haunted house. Sarah feels that something supernatural is present in the home and frightens her children at night. Her boyfriend remains skeptical of all of this, refusing to believe a ghost is haunting the house. In talking with her neighbor, she finds out that the previous tenants held black masses there. As a demonic presence tries to take control of the family, Sarah runs to a religious demonologist for help, who prepares a powerful ritual to extinguish the evil in the house for good.
26	10	"The Dark Side"	December 14, 2006	310
When Bobby Wilcott and his wife move into a historical house, it soon becomes clear that it is haunted by spirits. The doors and windows are constantly opening by themselves and the electricity in the house is often not working right. After the couple tried to deny giving any supernatural explanation, Bobby soon discovers that the property was built on the ruins of an old family cemetery.

=== Season 4 (2007) ===
No. overall	No. in season	Title	Original release date	Prod. code
27	1	"Dark Wrath"	August 10, 2007	401
Cindy and her boyfriend Jake move into a new house in Caseyville, Illinois. After their daughters discover a dark entity in the closet of their room, Jake becomes possessed by it and tries to harm them. As a result, Jake is taken by the police and soon he and Cindy divorce. Cindy sees a deceased woman in the bathroom mirror and goes to a priest for help. This angers the spirit who seems to be getting stronger as well. Cindy finally decides to take her daughters and leave the house. A few weeks after Cindy leaves the house to get on with her life, a family with five kids moves into the house and after a short time there, they also move out.
28	2	"The Awakening"	August 17, 2007	402
In Bloomington, Illinois, Randy and Marcy Wikoff both work in law enforcement. After their son's departure to the Middle East and a motorcycle accident outside their house, Marcy finds herself on the verge of a breakdown, especially when she finds herself threatened by an evil spirit. Marcy calls on a psychic and spiritual healer to rid the house of the evil entity. During the fight, Marcy and the psychic discover the evil male spirit has also been holding his family who died near the Wikoff property hostage for years. After successfully helping the female spirits cross over, Marcy regains her strength by demanding that the spirit give her back her house and orders him to leave. Now afraid of going to Hell for his actions, the male spirit begs the psychic for mercy and he is convinced to cross over to face God's judgment.
29	3	"The Calling"	August 24, 2007	403
Rebecca Lenox has the gift of being able to see and communicate with spirits. For many years it has been a family secret but when she comes face-to-face with entities in her home, her marriage and peaceful lifestyle are soon in a downward spiral. After paranormal investigators come to her house and calm the ghosts down, Rebecca learns how to deal with the ghosts that she sees.
30	4	"The Apartment"	August 31, 2007	404
Bill and Marissa Spencer are a newly married couple that buy themselves an apartment in Seattle. When the couple find themselves haunted by ghostly entities inhabiting the apartment, they go to paranormal researchers. However, they decide to move out of the apartment instead since they cannot get rid of the ghost.
31	5	"Spirits of the Dead"	September 14, 2007	405
Joanne and Jim Whitley buy an old farm in New Hampshire with the idea of carrying out a horse-riding business. After fixing up the property, they find themselves entering the world of the supernatural. A negative presence haunts the property, scaring off horse riders and attacking Joanne and Jim's son. It is then revealed that an evil spirit named Samuel is causing the trouble and also keeping captive four good spirits: a colonist soldier with his wife, a pioneer girl, and a Native American warrior as his slaves. Joan is faced with the decision to either fight off the spirit and save the ones held captive or leave the property. Joan chooses to fight Samuel off and successfully sends him to the other side to face God's judgment. This helps the trapped spirits cross over and gives the Whitleys back their lives.
32	6	"Where Evil Lurks"	September 21, 2007	406
The Shea family move into an Arkansas home. When they are faced with supernatural occurrences, they are skeptical at first. However, the mother, Jamie, finds out from a librarian that their home is haunted by the ghost of a little boy. The situation gets out of hand and soon a car accident occurs involving Jamie and her 11-year-old daughter, who is taken to the hospital. The family experience more trouble in the house and paranormal investigators are called in to help them. They use an ouija board which helps them identify the demonic entity named Seth who haunts the house. A ritual is carried about and Seth is believed to have been removed from the home. However, to the family's surprise, another demon has inhabited the house causing them to leave the property for good. Another family has moved into the house soon after, and while hearing the voices of the little boy, they have not encountered the demonic figures that have plagued the Sheas.
33	7	"Spellbound"	September 28, 2007	407
The Walson family, a family of three, find themselves living in a haunted house in the state of Ohio. The issue causes a conflict between the parents, Sandra and Steven, which results in Steven leaving the house and the family. With Sandra and their son Gene remaining in the house, Sandra's fascination with the supernatural starts to take an effect on her. When Gene goes into the army, Sandra starts doing witchcraft. After being discharged, Gene stops his mother from opening a doorway to the other side.
34	8	"Echoes of the Past"	October 5, 2007	408
In March 2005, Libby and Seán Johnson fix up a worn down, abandoned house in Chester, Vermont. Not too long after settling in, the family begins to hear strange noises during the night. They later realize that their presence and work around the house angered the entities inhabiting it. With nothing else to do, Libby and Seán turn to Wiccans for help. The Wiccans cross the ghosts over. Note: This story was also used as a setting for an episode in season 3 of the Sci-Fi Channel's Ghost Hunters.
35	9	"Ghost Hunter"	October 12, 2007	409
Paranormal investigator Stacey Jones lives in Syracuse, New York with her second husband Lloyd, and teenage son Jamie. When Stacey brings Jamie along with her mentor and the other investigators to investigate a cemetery that holds the bodies of many U.S. soldiers in many wars that goes back to the mid-18th century, Jamie is possessed by a spirit and his life begins going downhill. He does poorly in school, gets into trouble, and starts to have an attitude. After contacting paranormal researcher John Zaffis, Stacey soon realizes that Jamie is possessed by a demon that soon begins to strike her physically. An exorcism is planned at Zaffis' house to be performed. Before it, he warns Stacey to keep her distance because the demon is after her and will use Jamie to hurt her. During the exorcism, the priest's wife finds out the demon's name and her husband uses it to expel the demon spirit out of Jamie.
36	10	"Stalked by Evil"	October 19, 2007	410
The McCarthy family moves into a home in Corpus Christi, Texas, and finds themselves under the presence of a dark entity that soon focuses its target on the family's teenage daughter Caressa. To protect their family, they move out of the house.
37	11	"Casa De Los Muertos"	October 26, 2007	411
In 1974, Latin jazz guitarist Eddie Benitez finds himself face-to-face with a demonic spirit for the first time at age 14 who was possessing a cab driver. Nearly thirty years later and starting a family, he moves his family to a new home in Tempe, Arizona, hoping to get back into the music career he had ended many years before. Soon, he once again finds himself faced with the supernatural for the first time in three decades when his son begins to fall sick. An exorcism is performed to get rid of the spirit. Soon a former resident reveals to Eddie about her past experiences in the house he lives in that was started by her own father who died in the house. She had denied any involvement in mentioning her father because she was trying to protect her mother who had found out not only about his past of racism but also had been abused by him. The former resident warns him to move his family out of the house because her father's ghost isn't done with them yet. Realizing this, Eddie moves his family out of the house right away.
38	12	"Monster in the Apartment"	November 2, 2007	412
Twenty-year-old Morgan Knudson and her friend Bob l’Évêque move into an apartment in the Canadian province of Alberta. The apartment turns out to be haunted by the spirit of an eight-year-old boy who begins to cause Bob to switch into a negative personality. They call Lorraine Warren. Warren tells Morgan that the 8-year-old boy is really a demon who is possessing Bob, and soon after they quickly move out.
39	13	"Legend Trippers"	November 9, 2007	413
In Green Lake, Wisconsin, three young adult men head out to a cemetery near the city to investigate a legend they have heard from there. When they find themselves in the presence of spirits, they flee the cemetery. Afterward, another group of young adults head out there after overhearing the story from the three men at a gas station and find themselves undergoing the same experience, including one of them being scratched on the arms. Note: Guest star Chad Lewis of Unexplained Research.

=== Season 5 (2012) ===
Starting with this season, the series airs on Destination America. It also features a new opening introduction and narration.

No. overall	No. in season	Title	Original release date	Prod. code
40	1	"Blood Visions"	October 12, 2012	501
Betty Johnson and her family move into their new home in rural Michigan. As the Johnsons settle into their home, they start to experience strange supernatural occurrences. With that and a financial situation on their hands, the family relocates to another home hoping to leave their problems behind them. Unfortunately, when Betty's oldest child, Brinn, starts having visions of anything liquid appearing to be blood to him and is soon physically attacked, the family realizes the supernatural entity from their previous home has followed them. With the help of paranormal investigators and her family, Betty is able to clean their lives of the evil presence for good.
41	2	"Angels and Demons"	October 19, 2012	502
Kathie Sheats, a single mother, lives in Maryland and is raising her 15-year-old son Michael. In the fall of 2010, she moves into a new home with her boyfriend Brian whom she marries over the next few months. Hoping for her life to change for the good, a demonic presence lurks inside the house and begins to terrorize the family, especially Kathie. After Kathie's psychic friend, a priest and paranormal investigator are unable to rid the home of the evil, Kathie is forced to perform an exorcism by herself. In a battle between good and evil, a guardian angel comes down and helps Kathie defeat the demon.
42	3	"Nightmare in Bridgeport"	October 26, 2012	503
In Connecticut in 1962, Bob Baker befriends an evil entity that inhabited his parents' house. As time went on, Bob began to feel uncomfortable towards it. After finally telling it to leave him alone, he never sees it again for the rest of his childhood. Forty years later, Bob is now a child safety specialist during the day but has a second job as a paranormal investigator at night as a result of his childhood experience. His parents still live in the same house where he saw the entity as a child. After the death of his father, his mother starts to find herself in a strange situation with the supernatural. Colleagues and priests fail to clean the house of its evil, leaving Bob to face the demon and bring back peace into the house. They cannot get rid of the demon and the Bakers move out.
43	4	"House Of Horrors"	November 2, 2012	504
The Spencer family buys a historic home in the state of Arkansas. The parents, Mark and Rebecca, are skeptical of the supernatural world but they soon start to experience supernatural occurrences not too long after moving in. Mark does some research and learns that the house is haunted by a previous resident named LaDell Allen Bonner who committed suicide in the master bedroom on Christmas, 1948 at age 54. The Spencers remain skeptical of all of this until Rebecca sees the ghost of LaDell standing before her one day. Determined to get answers, Mark calls investigators to come and help them. Along the way, he uncovers a shocking truth regarding LaDell's suicide.
44	5	"Dark Dreams"	November 9, 2012	505
Chris Gibbons, a Michigan attorney, and his family move into a new home in Grand Rapids. Not too long after moving in, a ghost makes its presence known and nearly drives Chris insane after repeatedly messing with his dreams whenever he sleeps at night. With the help of paranormal investigators, priests, psychics, and shamans, Chris tries to find a way to protect his family from the evil spirit.
45	6	"Nightmare Upstairs"	November 16, 2012	506
The VanLandingham family with three children move into a bigger house in the small town of Wynne, Arkansas. The home is everything the family could have imagined it to be. However, that feeling soon fades after a supernatural entity physically attacks their daughters Heather and Brianna. The family contacts their pastor and a local paranormal investigator to help them but the entity turns out to be too much for them to bear. The family leaves their dream home, unable to combat the spirit that reclaims the house for itself.
46	7	"Back from the Grave"	November 23, 2012	507
In 2008, North Carolina residents Jamie and Aaron move into a new home in their small town and are also the parents of two young children, Mason and Lacey. Jamie is a stay-at-home mother while Aaron works late nights as a manager of a local truck company. One morning while Jamie and the kids take a walk through the neighborhood with Jamie's friend Pam, they pass through a small cemetery a few blocks from their home. While Pam decides to look around the cemetery, Mason sees the spirit of a man in a soldier uniform staring at him who had followed them back to their house later on. After Jamie finds Mason communicating with the spirit, who goes by the name of Gabel, at first she thinks it is an imaginary friend until strange occurrences begin to occur in the house. Soon, Aaron starts to notice these things too and Jamie overhears the spirit of a child laughing in her room while she is sleeping one night, revealing that Gabel was not the only spirit from the cemetery to follow the family back to the house. After more strange events take place, Jamie's friend Pam calls on a team of paranormal experts to keep the family out of harm's way.
47	8	"The Uninvited"	November 30, 2012	508
In 2007, Lynn and Jason Ryder become the new owners of an old bar called Morrie's in Meriden, Connecticut. They rename it "Ryders" after renovating, and while trying to run a happy business together with the help of Lynn's father, ghostly pranks and other supernatural activities occur which affect the staff and customers. Local psychic and spiritual healer Pam Faith visits the bar and tells Lynn that there is a dangerous demon haunting the bar. Pam rids the demon with prayer.
48	9	"The Exorcism of Cindy Sauer"	December 7, 2012	509
In Social Circle, Georgia, after her husband commits suicide, Cindy Sauer and her daughter Chassity are plagued by an evil entity. Chassity sees her dead father in the backyard and is tormented by a horrible nightmare. She believes the evil entity influenced her father's death. After several months, Cindy starts dating again and finds that her boyfriend is also interested in the paranormal. On the week of Halloween, the two of them investigate an abandoned house but they are soon driven away by a menacing figure. As they try to make their escape, Cindy is attacked by the demon and enters a state of possession. After paranormal investigators witness an attack on Cindy, they call in a priest, who performs an exorcism. The demon calls itself "Albin" and refuses to leave Cindy's body. After a series of prayers, the demon leaves temporarily. Cindy believes the ghost of her husband was trying to warn her about the evil entity. The demon is still trying to enter Cindy's life, who is trying to deal with the problem.
49	10	"Death's Door"	December 16, 2012	510
Victoria Dane tries to get her life back together again after accidentally having an overdose. She starts to notice unusual events going on in her home in Lafayette, Indiana, which she feels has something to do with the medication she is taking. After moving to New Mexico to be close to her relatives, the strange events follow her and begin to strike out at her physically. Aided by a local investigation company, Victoria comes to realize that the supernatural activity she is experiencing was conjured up from her near-death experience after overdosing. The questions remain of how she will be able to close the door to the paranormal world that has come to her attention. Paranormal investigators rid the aggressive ghost from Victoria. She will still see the other ghosts but it is better than the evil ghost that tormented her.

=== Season 6 (2013) ===
No. overall	No. in season	Title	Original release date
50	1	"Marked by Evil"	September 29, 2013
When Stephanie Winters rejects the advances of a friend, he steals a piece of her hair and threatens to put a spell on her. Soon after, Stephanie and her husband Nicholas are settling into their new home in Manassas, Virginia, when they notice strange noises and objects moving on their own. The couple suspects they are living with a poltergeist and attempt to ignore the activity, hoping it will move on. What starts as a few broken dishes quickly escalates when the entity in their home violently scratches Stephanie and tries to choke her. They realize this is something much darker and turn to a paranormal investigator for help. As the brutal attacks on Stephanie grow more frequent, the investigator seeks out the help of a religious demonologist and the church to rid their lives of the demon bent on destroying Stephanie.
51	2	"Well to Hell"	October 6, 2013
Mark Corvo returns to his childhood home, a large Colonial home in Cromwell, Connecticut. To earn extra income, he decides to rent the extra rooms to tenants. Soon, tenants report unusual things happening around the house but Mark rationalizes the mysterious sounds as living in a 100-year-old house. Later on, Mark notices a change in one of his favorite tenants, Ashley, and a few weeks later, Ashley has a mental breakdown and leaves the home. Mark reaches out to the Ghosts of New England Research Society for professional help. During their investigation, they discovered Ashley's dabbling in the dark arts opened a portal to the other side and drew spirits to the location. They also believe Mark is an Empath which is why he is experiencing so much activity. The team gives Mark guidance on how to deal with it and understand his gift. While doing repair work on his roof, Mark senses a dark presence behind him. He challenges the entity and is knocked off the roof, which nearly kills him. After recovering from his accident, Mark returns home with a renewed sense of hope. Although Mark will always have a connection with the spiritual world, he knows what will keep the activity at bay.
52	3	"Black Magic"	October 13, 2013
During the renovation of her 150-year-old home near Zieglersville, Pennsylvania, Debbie Guy notices several strange occurrences; lights turn on and off, doors open and close and objects move on their own. After seeing an apparition of a young girl, Debbie accepts the old house has a ghost and they will have to live with it. But when a teenage boy staying with Debbie dabbles into the occult, the paranormal activity in the house grows darker. A pastor attempts to bless the house; however, the activity continues. Soon after, the teenage boy delves deeper into black magic, ultimately taking a life in a ritual and unleashing forces he cannot control. Family members are tormented, scratched, and pushed by an evil entity and Debbie seeks the help of paranormal investigators who will face their toughest case yet.
53	4	"Haunted Victorian"	October 20, 2013
Edwin Gonzalez and Lillian Otero believe they have found their dream home in a beautiful Victorian mansion in Gardner, MA. Soon after, however, it becomes a nightmare. After moving in, the couple begins to experience strange occurrences like mysterious footsteps, doors slamming on their own, and unexplained noises. After Edwin witnesses a full-bodied apparition, he can no longer deny that their house is haunted. He reaches out to a series of paranormal investigators in the hopes that they can help. The situation becomes dire when Lillian's personality begins to shift and she becomes distant and depressed, as if being possessed by an evil spirit. She is physically attacked while sleeping and the couple tries to escape.

=== Season 7 (2014–15) ===
No. overall	No. in season	Title	Original release date
54	1	"Demon's Revenge"	August 1, 2014
In 2008, two different entities roam the property of a 200-year-old farmhouse in Franklin, Virginia, terrorizing a family of three living there. One of the entities is a former slave named Joseph who was given the property by his slave master after he was freed, while the other is a demonic spirit. Tiffany McKennan tries to convince her boyfriend, Billy Quattlebaum of the entities she's encountered or sensed in the house, but Billy remains skeptical and doesn't want this kind of talk to influence his daughter, Georgia, who enjoys the house. Within a few months after moving in, the demonic spirit takes control of Billy and turns him into an angry person. Nine months after moving into the house and with Billy finally believing her, Tiffany finally reaches out to paranormal investigator Jackie Tomblin and her team for help to uncover the demonic spirit who inhabits the house. When they investigate it, Jackie makes contact with Joseph and discovers that he has been trying to save Tiffany and her family from the demon by telling them to leave the house. Her team encounter the angry demon (whom Joseph had told Jackie about) and attacks them. She tells Tiffany and Billy of their investigations. While relieved that Joseph is a good spirit trying to protect their family, Tiffany and Billy still worry about the demon. Jackie and her team bless the house and for a while things are peaceful. When the demon attacks them again by killing off the chickens and hurts Georgia, Tiffany and her family move out of the house for good. In 2013, the house was sold to another family.
55	2	"The Shadowman"	August 3, 2014
In the late 1960s two brothers, Tom and Tim Yancey, encounter a demonic entity in the woods surrounding their home in Lake Worth, Florida. For some time, they try to ignore their experience of what they labeled as "the Shadowman" and get on with their summer. Tim wakes up one night to see the Shadowman lurking outside the window. He wakes up on a few occasions to find his brother sleepwalking. Their mother, Barbara, eventually suspects the house is haunted and tries, but fails, to call out the entity using a Ouija board. Eventually, an incident lands Tim in the hospital. Years later, Tim becomes a paranormal investigator. After many years of not seeing each other, the brothers finally come together after Tim buys the old house to settle unfinished business and get rid of the demon that haunts it.
56	3	"Demon Unearthed"	August 10, 2014
In early 2001, Norman and Jennifer Rice purchase a 19th-century Victorian house in Garden Grove, Iowa, originally owned by a banker and his wife. Jennifer becomes very attached to it and hires a team of contractors to work on the house while Norman is away at work. During the job, one of the workers is pushed off of a ladder and injured. After he flees the house, Jennifer and her eight-year-old son Andrew overhear the other two workers talking about an incident that happened in the house where a female servant, who ended up pregnant by the banker, had fallen down the stairs after an argument with the banker who then buried her in the basement. Jennifer thinks nothing of it but Andrew goes to investigate and is grabbed by an entity. Over the next several months, many contractors come and go refusing to work on the house anymore due to the rumored history. Jennifer is left to complete renovations by herself. She holds an open house and meets an old woman who is the great-niece of the banker who built the house. She gives Jennifer a scrapbook of pictures of the banker and his wife and is told to dismiss the rumors about the place. Jennifer learns the couple tried to have children of their own but could not. So the banker had an affair with the maid in the hopes she would get pregnant and give him a child to pass off his and his wife's own. However, when the banker's angry wife found out about the affair, he killed the maid to ensure his secret remained safe. Norman encounters the entity one day while investigating the basement. The presence causes him to become angrier and Jennifer is relieved when he leaves on a business trip for several weeks. It would not be for another two years before the family finally sells and leaves the house.
57	4	"Evil Never Dies"	August 17, 2014
In the summer of 2009, Jennifer Welborn and her boyfriend Jamie move into a million-dollar mansion in Pensacola, Florida, by the Escambia Bay with Jennifer's two teenage daughters Candace and Lauren. Two weeks after moving into the house, Jennifer notices the pictures on the walls hanging upside down and soon sees the ghost of a man watching her through the kitchen window one day. She believes the house is haunted but Jamie is unconvinced. Jennifer eventually talks to her daughters about her experience and learns they're going through similar ones and is relieved she isn't going crazy. Jennifer calls paranormal investigator Toni Tally to take a look through the house. Toni sees the name "Häl" written on the bathroom mirror and sees a dark shadow standing next to it. In the backyard, Toni has a vision of slaves hanging from the trees. Toni came to the conclusion that "Häl" was the slave owner of these slaves. Several weeks later after the cleansing, "Häl" comes back one night and grabs Jamie out of bed. Frightened and angry, Jamie grabs a gun and commands the spirit to show himself, now convinced the house is haunted. Toni comes to the family's aid once again and gets injured in the process. The incident caused her to stop doing house cleansing altogether. Jennifer and Jamie consider moving, but it's not until Lauren later encounters the spirit and is scratched that the family finally escape from the house.
58	5	"Ashes of Evil"	August 24, 2014
In October 2011, Amelia and Calvin Braddy move into a 19th-century house in Hampton, Tennessee. They are the parents of two young children, five-year-old Sarah and one-year-old Chelsea. One morning, Amelia hears noises and looks around but finds nothing that is causing it. Days later, the baseboard heater is mysteriously ripped off the wall in the girls' bedroom causing sparks and smoke. After the firefighters come, one of them tells Amelia that a mother accidentally caused a fire that killed her and her three children a decade earlier. Sarah then begins talking to "imaginary friends" who quickly scare her, which turn out to be the spirits of the children who were killed. Calvin encounters the entity while he's alone in the house but keeps it to himself. It later returns sucking the life out of Calvin while he's sleeping. After several more incidents, Amelia calls paranormal investigator Rob Phillips who lives in nearby Jonesborough, Tennessee, to help them. He and his assistant Kathy Shephard uncover that the house was once a halfway house for male prisoners in the 1920s and a man was shot outside on the porch. One day, while Calvin and Amelia pack up to leave, the doors and windows slam and shut, trying to trap them. Luckily, Calvin and Amelia run out of the house to safety.
59	6	"Devil Inside Me"	September 7, 2014
In the summer of 2003, twelve-year-old John Drenner, Jr. finds an old abandoned shack in the woods surrounding Odenton, Maryland, behind his grandmother's home. During his investigation of the shack, he came upon a book that detailed dark and satanic rituals, eventually learning the area was used by devil worshipers to perform their rituals. One night, his sister Cheryl hears him chanting in an unfamiliar language and when she stops him, his nose starts bleeding. Once the children go back home to nearby Pasadena, John becomes terrorized by a demonic entity every night who is hellbent on tormenting him. The demon refers to itself as "Legion", telling him that it won't stop until he is dead. The demon attacks continue for the next few years. By the age of nineteen, John becomes used to the attacks not knowing whom to go to for assistance with his tormentor. He goes as far as making suicide attempts to get out of it. Eventually, the demon begins to attack his girlfriend Mary with whom he had moved in with, hinting that it will kill her. John seeks help from a religious official who performs a deliverance on the young man, ridding him of the demonic attachment however, he feels, one day, that the demon may return, seeking revenge. Note: Sometime later in his life, he gets faced with another task of saving his friend from another severe demonic possession as featured in episode 14 of this season: "Curse of the Mummy". He also helps a Maryland couple, Bill and Amanda Toler, when they're dealing with a haunting themselves whose story is featured in the Season 8 episode: "Demons Never Die".
60	7	"Child's Play"	November 23, 2014
In the summer of 2013, Chris and Roseann Cupit move into a new home in Greenbrier, Arkansas, with their two children, thirteen-year-old Justin and ten-year-old Brittany. During a family prayer, Roseann senses an evil entity. It turns out Roseann has conjured with the supernatural as a child and is being reminded of that feeling. That night, Roseann comes face-to-face with a demon. Brittany soon hears voices that cause her to sing a song that Chris remembers his grandmother singing to him when he was younger. During another family prayer, Brittany senses an evil presence. She comes face-to-face with the beast one night and goes to sleep with her parents. Justin encounters it in the shower and is given scratch marks on his shoulder. In October 2013, Chris and Roseann reach out to paranormal investigators Wesley and Melissa Fox for help. Melissa encounters the demon who frightens her with her biggest fear, spiders. She reveals to the family that the house is haunted by the spirit of Chris’ grandmother and a demon. Roseann reveals that when she was young, she and her friends used a Ouija board to contact spirits and conjured up a demon. Melissa believes that the demon attached itself to her and now is starting to cause her trouble since the family got more involved in church. Wesley and Melissa bring in a demonologist, Joe Eder, to cleanse the house, and he is successfully able to remove the demon forever.
61	8	"Ghost Fury"	November 30, 2014
In the fall of 2008, Alicia and Scott Cain move into a four-bedroom home in Brookville, Ohio, with their three children. The hauntings begin six months later when Alicia hears thumping noises. One afternoon, she finds her six-year-old daughter Marissa talking to an "imaginary friend" named Jacob who has a brother named Steven, both boys wearing sacks over their heads. She tells Alicia that the boys were caught in a fire and were burned alive. Alicia is convinced the house is haunted and does research on the previous owners and comes across info from 1865 that supports what Marissa told her. Alicia goes to talk to a neighbor who tells her that someone was murdered there. Alicia obtains an article on the murder and learns that in the 1980s, a man had killed his wife. Paranormal investigators come in to capture voices. They call a priest, Allen Dershem, who seemingly cleanses the house. Everything is normal until a week later when Alicia finds a blood trail leading to Marissa's room and finds her with a big nosebleed. The family still continues to live in the house until they are financially able to move. Afterward, the paranormal investigators hope to come back to perform an exorcism.
62	9	"Nightmare in the Attic"	December 7, 2014
In 1983, Jesse and Carol Fox and their two children, seventeen-year-old Mary and eight-year-old Wesley, move into a new house in Lowell, Arkansas. Mary, a high school dropout, first encounters the spirit while unpacking material. While going on a bike ride, Wesley runs into a boy and a girl who tell him that his house is haunted. Wesley doesn't believe them, but one day while he and his niece Christy investigate the basement, they come across old shoes that move on their own. The house has a history of murders and suicides but none of the residents will tell the Foxes about their home. Carol hears thumping noises during many nights and accuses Mary of causing them, causing their relationship to become a conflict. Mary dreams of a pagan sacrifice ritual in her room featuring five people in robes killing a baby. She and Wesley encounter different entities; Mary sees an old man who was killed, and Wesley sees a lizard-skin demon. During a family meeting, Carol reveals she's heard angry voices in the hall. The family reaches out to their minister who is skeptical of them being haunted but tells them to believe in Jesus for comfort. Jesse contacts his sister, also named Mary, to help them. She and Mary uncover a pentagram underneath a rug in Mary's room. Aunt Mary senses that the demon is trying to control young Mary. The family pack up and leave the house immediately, though Mary doesn't want to go, growing a significant attachment to the house. Two years later, the house is demolished and many years after that, the family does research and learns that the rumors of the murders and rituals that have happened are true.
63	10	"Shape of Evil"	December 14, 2014
In September 2006, Jay Yaple moves his family into a late 18th-century house in Enfield, Connecticut. His wife Elka senses something odd about the house. It is not until seven months later that the hauntings begin to happen. Jay and Elka hear scratching noises on the walls; Jay suspects it's neighborhood kids but can't see anyone near the house. Several nights later, the couple wakes up to hear a static noise in their baby monitors and a female voice suddenly comes out saying "You all are going to die". Their twin girls begin communicating with an "imaginary friend" whom they call Casey. After more incidents, Jay does research at the town hall and comes across a long history of murders, suicides, and accidental deaths that have occurred in the house. He first invites a non-profit group of paranormal investigators to help them. One of them gets possessed and another is thrown against a wall. Later on, Jay wakes up to find "Casey" sucking the life out of him which then turns into an animal-like creature. Jay eventually calls a bishop who successfully cleanses the house, returning it to a peaceful state. The demon however returns, but the Yaples are stuck in the house until they can sell it.
64	11	"Trapped in Terror"	December 21, 2014
In 2013, Stephen McDade and his girlfriend, Taylor Jones, moved into a Turn of the Century home with their daughter outside Cincinnati, Ohio. No paranormal activity occurred until Ms. Jones's estranged mother arrived and told them their house was haunted by a young girl and her killer. After the mother left, paranormal activity began occurring on a regular basis. Researchers surmised that the house was haunted by a young girl and her killer who presumably committed suicide. In the end, Stephen calls paranormal investigators who are able to help cross the spirits over into the afterlife. Afterward, Taylor ceased all contact with her mother, believing that her delving into the occult was what led to the paranormal activity.
65	12	"Portal of Doom"	December 28, 2014
In the spring of 2009, a mother and son battle a vicious demon who inhabits an ancient artifact. Anita and Chris Intenzo are haunted by a demonic entity allegedly attached to a Peruvian artifact belonging to Anita's late friend Paul who was an archaeologist. The artifact was stolen from a grave, possibly from the Nazca culture. When the artifact is brought into their home on Stanton Drive in Havertown, Pennsylvania, intense paranormal activity begins. The house was built in the 1940s on top of the foundation of a Victorian farmhouse where John Stanton murdered his wife and burned her body. The house was blessed though minor activity continues to this day.
66	13	"Ghost Inferno"	January 5, 2015
In the small town of Bagley, Iowa, a family of four: Craig and Kimberly Atkins and their two young daughters, move into a farmhouse in 2013. It was originally owned by Craig's grandmother Linda who sells it to them at a low price after her husband dies. A few days later, the couple's four-year-old daughter Cheylin has made a new "imaginary" friend named Jacob. Kimberly notices this and gets suspicious when her daughter describes him in great detail. She and Craig wake up that night to see what they believed was an intruder in the house. The guy runs off and is nowhere to be found. Craig changes all of the locks. One day, the girls' room is destroyed. Kimberly feels that the man she's seen in the house is a ghost. While Craig and Kimberly are in the kitchen, a pan moves by itself and flies across the room nearly hitting Cheylin when she walks in. Craig and Kimberly go to a library to pull up records on the property and learn from an elderly woman that a chemical plant once stood where the house is and unfortunately burned down and no one knew how it started. Three men lost their lives there and one of the workers who died was named Jacob. After a funeral attempt and house cleansing to put Jacob at peace fails, the family finally leaves the house.
67	14	"Curse of the Mummy"	January 11, 2015
In March 1997, fourteen-year-old Caleb Weaver becomes the target of a spiritual creature guarding a mummy he encounters during a school field trip to a science museum. For years afterward, he is terrorized by this creature until he finally leaves his home after graduating high school. He is able to gain a peaceful life and moves to Maryland, later working as a security guard. He gains a girlfriend named Laura and also makes friends with none other than John Drenner, Jr. (whose story was shared in a previous episode in this season: "Devil Inside Me"), who also works as a security guard at his job. In 2013, he returns home to visit his parents for the first time in years. The creature, which Caleb manages to identify as Sobek, returns and this time possesses Caleb and changes his whole personality which concerns John and Laura when he returns to Maryland. When John is unsuccessful in removing the entity from Caleb, he calls in his mentor Billy Bean to help him by performing an exorcism.
68	15	"Conjuring Evil"	January 17, 2015
In Wasilla, Alaska, lives the Murphy family consisting of Cindy and Harold Murphy, their teenage daughter Annie, and Cindy's mother Judy who stays in her own cabin next door on the property. Unknowingly to her parents, Annie gets interested in witchcraft. In October 2012, Annie and a friend perform a chant one night which summons a demonic entity that they both see in the window of Judy's cabin. The next day, Annie undergoes an episode where the demon makes her angry, violently setting silverware down on the kitchen counter and then smashing a glass jar of sauce on the floor. One day when Cindy goes to check on her mother, one of Judy's shot glasses breaks mysteriously and Judy sees the demon standing behind her but disappears when Cindy looks around. For days, Judy experiences many odd things happening in her cabin. She sees the demon one night which violently attacks her and sends her to the hospital. There, Cindy notices marks on Judy's right arm and a large scratch mark down her back. Cindy suspects their property is haunted. Although not yet convinced there is a haunting, Harold uses a camera and an EVP recorder to capture the spirit and he catches a voice on the recorder. In March 2013, paranormal investigators come to investigate the haunting, perform a cleansing, and successfully remove the demon from Judy's home. By August 2014, everything is still running smoothly with no disturbances and Judy has since moved back into her cabin.
69	16	"Phantom Room"	January 23, 2015
In San Dimas, California (2001), the couple Shari and Erol, discover a secret room in their new home; then a volatile ghost becomes enraged and tries to drive them out. When a couple of researchers come in, they discover the truth about a former resident who died of a drug overdose after his family left him. They warn the family that they need to leave at once, knowing it will get worse. The family finally leaves the house to stay with the wife's parents. However, the two eventually divorce, and the wife's mother blames it on the angry ghost who caused it.

=== Season 8 (2016) ===
An eighth season of the show premiered on January 3, 2016. This season also features a new opening sequence.

No. overall	No. in season	Title	Original release date
70	1	"Heartland Horror"	January 3, 2016
In Stockport, Iowa, a sixteen-year-old named Nolan Lydolph has a special gift that he's had since he was six years old: he could see spirits. His mother Jacque also has a gift, but more of a feeling type. His father Dennis has no abilities of the supernatural and has been a skeptic of it all. One day, the family takes a trip over to Branson, Missouri, where they go on a tour through a ghost town led by Wesley and Melissa Fox. After the family returns home, Nolan and his girlfriend Angela see the spirit of a teen boy in his bedroom while they are watching a movie. Nolan insists they shouldn't be worried as it didn't try to harm them. After basketball practice, Nolan believes one of the cats was scratching in the basement where his room is. After his shower, he goes to investigate. He feels the storage room is holding something. One night, the spirit of the young boy scratched him. One morning, Jacque receives scratches on her arm with Dennis present. Dennis realizes there is paranormal activity going on as there is no way to rationalize what happened. The couple reaches out to Wesley and Melissa. Wesley says the haunting is demonic. He gives them instructions on how to stop the haunting. For three months it appears to have worked until one day Nolan sees the spirit of the boy again and it turns into a gargoyle. He keeps it to himself and doesn't tell his parents. Jacque senses the entity is back. Wesley and Melissa come to the house to investigate. Melissa discovers the demon in the tree in the backyard. She believes the demon came from the tour in Branson and followed Nolan due to him being a deacon of light. A second cleaning is done and the demon is believed to be gone again. Over the following weeks, Nolan receives scratches and bruises and his behavior starts to turn negative. Nolan has a recurring dream about being in the storage room and committing suicide. He awakens to the demon telling him to do it. Demonologist and ordained minister Joe Eder comes to perform an exorcism and successfully removes the demon from the house. To this day, Nolan continues to see the spirits of family members and friends who have passed.
71	2	"Mind Control"	January 10, 2016
In March 2012, Amanda Morrison comes to a nursing home in Holly, Michigan, to visit her elderly relative William Smith. He doesn't seem to recognize her due to an illness that's swollen his brain due to years of alcoholism. To pay for his care, Amanda tells him how his home is being bought out. William grabs Amanda's hand in response but doesn't say anything. Two weeks later, Amanda and her husband Nate come to the home to work on it with their two kids; twelve-year-old Alliah and eight-year-old David. While looking around the house, Amanda comes across witchcraft books and a snake necklace. After the house is cleaned up, Amanda goes to see him and William blames her for putting him there and for her to get out of his house. Nate is vacuuming one day and comes across a tall shadow in a human shape that emerges from the floor behind him. The family gives the house up to a guardian to sell and to this day it is unknown if it's sold. David takes the necklace from the house as a souvenir that unleashes a dark entity into the house. David has recurring nightmares and Alliah is slowly pulling away from the family wanting nothing to do with them. One night, the spirit causes Alliah to carve "HELP ME" into the wooden head of her bed. They take her to a psychiatrist who claims she's suffering from depression. Amanda discovers the necklace in Alliah's room and learns David had taken it with him. She throws it out, but the shadow continues to torment the family, particularly Alliah who had begun to control her thoughts. The family calls in demonologist Samantha Harris to help and senses what she believes to be a demon heavily present in Alliah's room. She and the family deliver a prayer and they successfully remove the demon from the house. David is no longer having nightmares and Alliah is no longer undergoing depression.
72	3	"Eternal Grief"	January 17, 2016
In October 2008, 24-year-old Jennifer Pattison moves into her new home in Warsaw, Indiana. On the day Jennifer is hosting a dinner party, Jennifer's friend Sara comes by the home and feels something off about it. She notices fifty dead flies underneath a rocking chair Jennifer found in the basement. At the party, a man comes up to Jennifer and tells her that she is in danger of a spirit that doesn't want her in the house. Jennifer blows it off as some sort of prank. At night, she gets a smell of aftershave out of nowhere. She then hears voices coming from down the hall but doesn't see anything. Sara stays over one night and is unable to sleep and hears the voices of the spirits from a bedroom. When she opens the door, the voices stop and she sees nothing. A spirit of a man comes up from behind and blows on her, but disappears. Sara tells Jennifer to leave, but Jennifer doesn't want to. At work, a co-worker tells Jennifer about the previous owner, Eli Jones, who built the house for him and his wife. His wife died, leaving him distraught. Seven months before Jennifer moved in, Eli had died. The coworker lastly tells Jennifer how Eli used lots of aftershave. Jennifer tries to talk to Eli, feeling sorry for him for losing his wife, but Eli urges her to get out. She tries to make a deal with Eli and agrees not to remove him from the home. Three years later, Jennifer lets her boyfriend Shawn Williams move in. Sara liked this idea as she felt his presence would help calm things down. Shawn wasn't convinced the house was haunted but believed something was going on. Eli makes his presence known again and Shawn comes face to face with him in the basement one night. In July 2013, an all-female paranormal team led by Tina Lano and Jackie Mossburg Hicks, come by to investigate the house while Shawn was at work. While there, Jackie Mossburg Hicks hears audible voices in the breezeway, that are later confirmed by 7 EVPs, with three voices on them. Cheryl, Tina, and Jennifer also hear the voices. Jennifer then decides she must leave. One of the women, Cheryl Ferguson, has a flashback of Eli's death being because of cancer. She sees Eli and nearly feels nauseous and dizzy over it. Cheryl declares he is not going to leave the house. Jennifer wonders if there is any way she can stay in the house. Tina suggests she and Eli share it and get along, but Jennifer can't show off any fear. Days later, she shows fear and Eli pushes her down the basement stairs, breaking her arm. She and Shawn finally move out of the house.
73	4	"Game of Lies"	January 24, 2016
In 2010, the Barba family move into their own home in Elkton, Maryland. The family consists of the parents, Olivia and Jesse, and their five-year-old daughter Marie. Up until that point they've been staying with Olivia's parents. One day while Marie is playing in the backyard, Marie tells her mother that she had finished playing with a boy named Jackson. Olivia believes the boy to be real and living in the neighborhood. It turns out that Jackson is actually a ghost haunting the Barba home. A few nights later, Olivia wakes up to the sound of banging on the wall. Jesse goes to investigate and finds no one in the house. Olivia eventually finds Marie talking to herself and discovers Jackson to be an imaginary friend, but Marie claims he is very real. Marie starts wanting to sleep in her parents' room, so they set up a baby monitor to keep an eye on her. Olivia hears a man's voice coming from the monitor, but when she and Jesse go to Marie's room, they don't see anyone else there with her. Marie eventually ends up with bruises that didn't come from her falling or bumping into something. Jackson convinces her to keep her mouth shut about the situation. Olivia is horrified when she learns from Marie that Jackson wants her to go up to heaven with him, urging her not to play with him anymore. Olivia finally realizes Jackson is a ghost. Jesse brushes it off as being a phase. He goes to talk to a neighbor about strange occurrences in the house. He learns about an old man who lived there who didn't like kids and eventually died. The old man turns out to be Jackson who was taking on the form of a child to get close to Marie. He shows his true form when Marie rejects him and attacks her. Jesse gets angry and screams at the ghost. The couple calls paranormal investigators for help. Donna Gollab, a third-generation wiccan, discovers that the old man was lonely in life and possibly jealous of seeing a happy family living there. Donna performs a cleansing and removes Jackson from the house.
74	5	"Evil Rises"	January 31, 2016
In Montandon, Pennsylvania, in June 2013, Jacinda Rearick is recovering from a back injury. Her family had since moved into a three-bedroom home from their mobile home fourteen years earlier. Living with her are her caring husband Todd and their nineteen-year-old son Justin, who recently graduated from high school and works at a hardware store. While looking at pictures from Justin's graduation, she finds orbs in them. When the lights flicker, she believes it's a sign from her deceased parents to comfort her with her health issues. A long-time believer in the spirit world, she takes photos just to capture any more orbs. She manages to capture one photo showing a dark figure standing in an adjacent room next to the hallway. One day, she senses a presence in her home and discovers her pills stacked up on her dresser in her room. Todd and Justin are skeptical of the paranormal and blow off everything Jacinda tries to show them about it. In the fall, Justin has shoulder surgery and is stuck in the house. He hears footsteps walking above and it's only him in the house. He believes it is an intruder, but it's actually a dark entity with many tentacles inhabiting the house. Justin sees it in a photo his mother had saved on her computer. He then hears the clack of a pool cue ball striking in the house and rushes down to his room in the basement. He finds the pool balls on the table have been scattered. He then looks up and sees the entity, which then vanishes right before his eyes. He finally believes his mother and reports the incident to her. Jacinda sees it while painting and gets irritated when Todd doesn't believe her. The situation takes a toll on Todd who starts drinking heavily. One night, the spirit attacks him during family dinner, causing him to clutch at his chest and finally see it standing across from him. After more strange occurrences, paranormal investigator Kevin Tersavige and his team come to investigate. Kristeen and the other psychic, Liz, sense the spirits of Jacinda's parents trying to protect the family from the evil. She also gets a vision of European settlers who performed animal sacrifices and rituals on the property centuries earlier. They believed the ritual opened a gateway for the dark entity. The psychics both have encounters with the entity, with Kristeen seeing it in the form of a young boy in the kitchen and Liz getting grabbed and wrapped up in its black tentacles in the master bedroom. Despite nothing bad happening in the house for all the years the family has been there, the entity finally made its move when Jacinda had her surgery. Kevin is attacked during the cleansing but succeeds in vanishing the demon away. Todd is finally convinced they were under a paranormal influence.
75	6	"Tunnel Of Death"	February 14, 2016
In Grundy, Virginia, a young couple, Candace and Jon Sinclair, go to investigate the tunnels beneath the foothills in the spring of 2010. The tunnels are believed to be haunted by a group of slaves who were sealed up alive in the walls as a result of one of them being accused by their slave master of having an affair with his wife, causing them to rebel which led to their punishment. Candace and Jon return home and unbeknownst to them, a demon from the tunnels has followed them and is now haunting their house. The couple's five-year-old daughter Jacie has trouble sleeping and sleepwalks into her parents' room. While sewing, Candace hears the sound of glass breaking downstairs and goes down there to discover all of the dishes broken. There were no intruders in the house. One night when Candace goes to turn the heat down, she is grabbed by a demon. The next day she comes face to face with it, terrifying her. Other instances happen such as the television set turning channels on its own and Candace getting choked by the gargoyle and receiving scratches; the latter situation Jon brushes off as her having a bad dream and falling out of bed. Candace does a prayer that temporarily stops the paranormal activity. It eventually resumes and the demon makes its presence known to Jon in a dream where it tears his heart out. After Jon wakes up and goes downstairs, the demon attacks him for real, lifting him up in the air by his neck and choking him. The couple calls paranormal investigator Stacy Cookenour to uncover who the entity is. They realize that the entity came from the tunnels and attached itself to Candace. The family calls a pastor to cleanse the house which seemingly works. However, one day, the family is about to leave for an outing. After Candace goes upstairs to get her purse and is about to come back down, she sees what appears to be Jacie sitting on her bed in her room. Candace sees the real Jacie downstairs with Jon. The figure turns around towards Candace and is revealed to be the demon disguised as Jacie with bloody scratches and dark eyes. It rushes towards Candace, then flies downstairs and scratches Jacie. Candace angrily yells at the demon from downstairs to leave her family alone and to hurt her instead. The family finally leaves the house with the demon still there.
76	7	"House Of Sorrows"	February 21, 2016
In the summer of 2012, Jamie and Darrin Shriver find a house to move into in St. Clair, Missouri. They learn that a family of four had previously died there of carbon monoxide poisoning. A few days after settling in, Darrin senses a presence while organizing boxes. When he and Jamie come across a tricycle that belonged to one of the kids who died, Darrin asks Jamie if she feels safe in the house. Jamie decides it's okay since all the gas appliances were ripped out to avoid the monoxide incident happening again. One night, Darrin sees the shadow of a child run past the television but Jamie doesn't notice. On an early morning, he wakes to see a female apparition with blonde hair standing by his bed. When he tells Jamie this, she believes he's just seeing things out of the stress of working too much. Later on, she and Darrin hear a child's voice responding to a statement Darrin made and believe that it could have been a child outside who heard them talking, but there was no child outside. Jamie believed in the paranormal but didn't believe that spirits could linger in limbo. Over the next several weeks, Darrin has recurring nightmares of what he's experienced so far. He starts to grow ill as though undergoing the monoxide poisoning the previous family endured and this makes Jamie worried. Tragedy strikes when one of their pit bulls, Lucy, is killed after being struck by a car outside. Darrin and Jamie discover that she was under the influence of the spirits that forced her to viciously bite her way through the cage she was locked in. Paranormal investigator Steven LaChance and a sensitive, Theresa Reavey, help. Jamie announces that they're expecting their first child. Steven believes the haunting is demonic. Theresa senses the female blonde and sees the child's spirit. When she approaches the dog room and sees the other dog still in its cage, she comes across a dark mist that she cleanses away. The couple is advised to think happy thoughts and for a while, this keeps the house clean. By the spring of 2014, their son Andrew is born, and Darrin decides to open a ghost box app on his phone and communicate with the spirit, unleashing the trouble back into the house. Jamie has several nightmares involving Andrew being harmed and wakes up to Andrew crying. Too ashamed to bring back Steven and Theresa to help, Darrin calls upon two new people, pastor Fred Wells and his wife Shawna, to cleanse the house and they succeed.
77	8	"Demons Never Die"	March 6, 2016
In 2013, Bill Toler, a brick mason, is assigned a job at a local penitentiary in Baltimore, Maryland. A spirit attaches itself to Bill when he cuts his finger on his saw in an old execution chamber room. He returns to his home in the suburbs of Pasadena, Maryland, where he lives with his wife Amanda and his toddler son Colin. He's also the father of two other sons, Corey and Byron, from a previous relationship whom he has shared custody with. Amanda hears a banging noise and whispers calling her name one day as she's hanging up pictures, and at first, believes it's Bill calling to her. Late at night, the couple hears footsteps from upstairs. They know it's from Colin, who was asleep, or the other boys who were back with their mother. Over the following weeks, Amanda and Colin begin to feel their energy being drained, immediately going to the couch when they enter the house together to take a nap. Amanda has nightmares of finding herself being strapped to a gurney and facing death by lethal injection. Bill wakes up one night receiving two scratches on his back. Corey and Byron have an experience when they return to the house where they see a shadowy face on a black garbage bag looking at them. The Tolers call in John Drenner, Jr. (featured in two previous episodes: "Devil Inside Me" and "Curse of the Mummy") to help them. John investigates the house and feels the spirit is demonic. He finds Colin in the kitchen interacting with it which is calling itself "Rodicon". John urges Amanda not to say the name or else it'll give the demon more power. John cleanses the house; however, it doesn't work when Colin continues to interact with the demon. The family calls John back who brings a demonologist, Mike Stevenson, to give further insight on the matter. He discovers Bill's tool bag in the basement and feels they need to bless the tools that the demon attached itself to. Later on, Colin has a nightmare of the demon pushing him in front of a car. The couple goes to see a psychic who already knew about the nightmare before they could tell her and advises them to get out of the house. The Tolers leave the house and move into another.
78	9	"Ghosts Of War"	March 13, 2016
In 2009, Debbie and Dennis move into a house in Corning, Ohio. While unpacking, Dennis comes across his deceased father's memorabilia of material from World War II where he fought as an American soldier. One of the items, a Nazi armband with a prominent swastika, takes a toll on Debbie who wants him to get rid of it. The armband turns up missing and neither Dennis nor Debbie has moved it. After Debbie takes a shower, she notices a cross in frost on the mirror and snaps a picture of it for Dennis to see it. The cross is still in the mirror when Dennis comes in but soon vanishes before their eyes. Debbie is convinced that it meant a sign of protection, but Dennis felt it meant nothing. One day, they babysit their great-grandson, Jeffrey. While Debbie makes him a sandwich, she gets a puff of cigarette smoke in her face out of nowhere. As Jeffrey is playing with toy soldiers, a spirit of a Nazi soldier appears to him and Jeffrey wants him to play with him. When the spirit makes his toy soldiers (the "good guys") disappear one by one, Jeffrey snaps at him and the Nazi soldier turns into a grotesque-looking demon and screams in his face. He rushes outside into his mother's arms who arrived to pick him up. Debbie turns around and sees the spirit in the window looking at her and snaps a picture of it on her phone. She shows it to Dennis. Later on during the night, they wake up to the sounds of the Nazi spirit and fighting the spirit of Dennis' father, John. The spirits vanish when Dennis comes downstairs to investigate. Sometime later, Debbie is strangled by the Nazi soldier. The couple finally calls paranormal investigators Lee Allen and Jim Wilson to their home who bring along lead psychic Deb Lantz. She senses John and he jumps into her body to channel the Nazi soldier and defeats him. His dark energy disappears and Deb tells Dennis that his father was there to protect him and Debbie. John then has his son recover the old letter he's written to his mother, which brings him at peace and he finally crosses over into the afterlife. No other paranormal activity occurs at the house.
79	10	"Vision Of Terror"	March 20, 2016
In the summer of 2004, the Stowe family is living the perfect dream in Apex, North Carolina. The parents, Mike and Stacy Stowe have a three-year-old son, Cameron, and are expecting a daughter soon. While hanging outside of their home as a family, Stacy has a vision of a car accident. To not worry her husband, she doesn't tell him about it. But later on that day, Mike ends up in a car accident and is killed. Stacy is now left to move on as a single mother and a widow. Nine years later, Cameron is now twelve, and the daughter, Bryn, is nine. One afternoon while the kids are gone, Stacy is alone in the house cleaning and comes across a small clear teddy bear object with her husband's birthstone in it. Days later, Cameron is in the living room and the fireplace turns on by itself. At night, Stacy wakes up and discovers Mike is in bed with her. Bryn has a dream of a gargoyle appearing to her and dragging her down the hall by her leg outside of her mother's room. The dream becomes real when she sees what she believes is her father, but the spirit quickly changes appearance to the monster in her dream. Shortly afterward, Cameron goes to get a snack during the night when he hears whispers. He encounters the gargoyle standing behind him and he runs to his mother's room to alert her and his sister who was sleeping there as well. Cameron ends up joining them when he doesn't feel comfortable being in his room alone. Spiritual cleanser Johnny Jones comes to seek out the spirit and senses that it is demonic. The demon tries to grab Bryn and drag her across the floor, but Johnny intervenes and sends it away. He warns the family that other spirits may try to enter into their lives if they are vulnerable enough. For a while things are fine, but the gargoyle returns and attacks Bryn, first slapping her down in the bathroom, later spinning her bed around while she is on it, and then scratching her when she runs to her mother. Rather than call Johnny again, Stacy calls psychic medium Claudia Granger to help this time. She immediately senses a dark energy and reveals a seance was done by Stacy's two teenage nieces when they were trying to conjure up Mike's spirit. A portal was left open in Bryn's room. Claudia leads the family through a chant and successfully closes the portal, sending the demon away forever. Before leaving, Claudia reveals to Bryn that she has a psychic gift and that's why she was the main target of the attacks. She agrees to train Bryn in case this was to happen again.

=== Season 9 (2016–17) ===
Starting with this season, the show airs on the TLC Network.

No. overall	No. in season	Title	Original release date
80	1	"Demon's Lair"	October 21, 2016
In the late 1980s, a haunting occurs in Brentwood, Pennsylvania. Bob Krammer, baptized into the Catholic church, purchases a home he grew up in. Over the years, his wife, Lesa, and his four children, Jessica, Bobby, David, and Charlie, learned that they had a ghost in the house but they consider it friendly. In 2004, Jessica moves back home with her husband Tom, and her son Colin. Jessica didn't think it was much of an issue given the history but tried to chalk it up saying it's just an old house. One night, Tom sees the ghost of a woman he believes is Jessica in his stepson's room when he goes to check on him. Bob decides to spend the night in the room praying for an hour while Colin is with his parents. He falls asleep on the bed and awakens to it pounding on the wall. The ghost comes up and scratches him on the neck and chest area. A CD comes flying past Bobby and shatters in front of him. A priest, Mike Salvagna, is invited to the home to bless it. It becomes clear there is something evil in the house. More occurrences continue and another priest, Ron Lenguin, comes to investigate further. He tells the family to either stay or leave. Bob decides to stay and fight the ghost. After more incidents happen, a paranormal team comes and discovers a picture of the property with the name "Malik" on it which relates to the name of the demon "Moloch" in the Bible which people summoned during sacrifices of children. The paranormal team leader believes someone cursed the property with that name. The female ghost turns out to be a servant of Moloch named "Sathi". Bob learns that centuries earlier, a woman's children were killed by Indians near the home. Several months later, Father Mike returns, traps the demon in the corner, and sends it away forever with a prayer. Bob places a crucifix on the spot to keep the spot pure and gives the house a new name: Grand Oaks Manor so it would no longer be the "Malik" house.
81	2	"Ghost Confessions"	October 28, 2016
In New Haven, Connecticut, Macy Sherman is an all-American teenager who experiences a haunting in 2014 when she turns seventeen. On the night of her birthday, Macy meets up with friends in the woods near the water tower and learns of a teenage boy who fell off the tower and died twenty-five years earlier. Her boyfriend Nigel however suggests that the accident was actually a murder and he was pushed. She leaves early at her mom's request and finds herself followed by something and runs all the way home. The spirit of the teenage boy latches itself onto her. The next day, she finds her brush missing after she sets it down. Carrie hears someone walking up the stairs and no one responds and finds the mirror had fallen off the wall but it wasn't broken. Macy comes home from school and hears laughter, assuming it's Kelsey. She finds her hairbrush in the corner of her closet and starts to think a ghost is there. She goes into the garage and thinks she saw her father in the garage but finds him in the house. They go out to investigate and see no one. Macy goes to stay with friends to stay out of the house, often leaving Kelsey alone while their parents are out. Kelsey's radio skips and hears footsteps downstairs. She finds the piano playing by itself. Carrie comes in and sees this too. The girls and Carrie have a meeting about their experiences. That night, the teenage spirit takes the form of Mike and gets in bed with Carrie. She finds him gone and calls Mike and is surprised to learn he was still in New Jersey. The Shermans call on paranormal investigator Kurt Knapp and psychic Karen Hollis to seek the house out for the spirit. Karen senses the spirit in Macy's room. The ghost reveals himself to be Shawn and sends Karen a vision of him and another boy climbing the water towel while he was alive and drinking alcohol. The other boy slips and falls to his death. Carrie knew Shawn back when she was in high school and attended school with him. Shawn felt guilty over his friend's death and possibly killed himself. He latched onto Macy feeling as though she was his mother, who he knew. Kurt told the family to make him feel welcome as he was probably looking for a family and cross over when he was at peace.
82	3	"Immortal Love"	October 28, 2016
In 2012, Whitney and Chris Morris move to Yutan, Nebraska, to raise their young daughter Lilly in a two-bedroom home. Lilly immediately makes friends with the neighborhood kid and notices a ghost of a man by a tree waving at her. After a few days, Lilly wakes up to hear arguing from the ghost and a woman and goes to alert her mother, who feels she had a bad dream. One morning the ghost watches Chris and Whitney share a kiss before she leaves off from work which makes him jealous. That night, Whitney hears noises and is kissed by the ghost on her neck from behind. The ghost possesses Chris, acts strangely, and argues with Whitney about cheating on him when she comes home late from work. Whitney finally comes face to face with the man one night and he vanishes and appears to Lilly, showing her the back of his head which was all busted out from a gunshot. Whitney calls a paranormal team to help but first has to confront Chris on the matter. He is still possessed by the ghost and he destroys the garage and almost attacks Whitney but punches the wall behind her instead. Chris snaps from the ghost's influence and says he needs help. During the paranormal investigation, one of the team members has a vision of the argument the ghost (whose name turns out to be Jimmy) had with his girlfriend and later shot himself in the mouth in the garage out of depression. Whitney reminded Jimmy of his girlfriend and thus possessed Chris to get with her. Whitney confronts Jimmy in Chris' car and gets him to cross over. Afterward, everything is calm at the house, but the family moves to a new home in the summer of 2013.
83	4	"Love Curse"	November 4, 2016
In 2007, Lee Moore has nightmares of being in the woods and being followed. His girlfriend Alyssa isn't sympathetic of his situation and nitpicks at him over petty things. Alyssa tells him that she is hanging out with her friend Cheryl who is into witchcraft. Lee doesn't take a liking to her and as it turns out, Alyssa is having Cheryl put a curse on Lee to send him away since she doesn't have the courage to break up with him directly. Thus, Alyssa ignores Lee's problems and the couple split up. Five years later, Lee moves to St Louis, Missouri, and meets another woman named Claire, who is nothing like Alyssa, and marries her after a few months of dating. After settling into their new house, Lee hears knocks and Claire dismisses it as the old furnace acting up. One night, Lee wakes up to hear crashing and when he goes downstairs, the coffee table flips over and tries to convince Claire something paranormal is in the house. Claire is pushed by something while in the garage and knocked to the ground and sees a creature while she is taking a bath. Afterward, she announces that she's pregnant. A stern woman named Leta investigates the house and immediately sets up an EVP session after feeling a presence. She declares a demon is there and sends demonologist Kenneth Deel and his wife Farah to investigate. They realize the curse Cheryl and Alyssa put on him lay dormant for all this time until he met Claire and decided to lash out again. A blessing is done and the demon appears to choke Lee. Everything is fine for months. Leta returns to do a cleansing after having a vision that the demon is not gone, but her pagan cleansing opens the door for it to return and severely injures Lee giving him brain damage. While he is in the hospital, Kenneth and Farah visit and say a religious prayer that breaks the curse and cures Lee once again.
84	5	"Ghost Protector"	November 12, 2016
In Cincinnati, Ohio, 24-year-old Kelly Cataline wants to introduce her boyfriend Chris to her parents. It is the 1990s and they meet up in a bar to talk. After she leaves, Chris gets into an altercation with two guys and is stabbed. Later on, he dies of his injuries. The tragic loss haunts Kelly for years, even during her relationship with another man. In 2010, she and her fifteen-year-old daughter Samantha move into a rental house. Samantha comes across a picture of her mother and Chris. Kelly hears noises from upstairs of things being moved around. While she is at work, Samantha and her friend Haley are alone in the house watching a movie and they hear loud footsteps. Samantha figured her mom was home from work but that wasn't the case and a purse is thrown at her. Kelly comes home and figures Samantha was hearing things. One night, she sees an "I love you" message flashing on the TV screen and later on during the day hears tapping sounds on the upstairs closet door. She suspects Chris is there and decides to keep it to herself. Samantha wakes up feeling as though she's being watched and checks the halls and a dark monster figure comes out of the closet and approaches her. Kelly comes to her rescue and finds her crying. Kelly tells her it's Chris and that he's protecting them but Samantha doesn't believe it. Over the next several weeks, Kelly senses Chris all the time and hands Samantha a crucifix to protect her. But while Samantha is sleeping, she is scratched by the monster. Paranormal investigator Dale Hamblin comes to perform an EVP session. There are two entities in the house, one of them being Chris and he's been battling the monster trying to get rid of it. Kelly then remembers visiting Chris' grave years ago and used a Ouija board to contact him which also triggered the monster. Since she didn't properly end the conversation and left the portal to the spirit world open, both spirits attached to her. Dale and Kelly say a prayer in the basement and Dale is attacked. The house seemed fine afterwards, but the monster returns and causes Kelly and Samantha to officially leave the house.
85	6	"Fear Feeder"	November 19, 2016
In the winter of 2007, Al Gonzalez moves into a new home outside of Fort Wayne, Indiana, after getting a divorce. His brother Mario moves in. There were a lot of possessions left behind by the previous owners and he finds a stack of poems about the various things in life and the content gets darker as he reads on; dealing with the topic of suicide. Al sets up his home office and hears thumps coming from the living room. He comes face to face with a ghost and believes the house is haunted. One night, Al shows him the poems he read and Mario is stunned and suggests he throw them out. Another day comes; he hears more thumping sounds and tries to pray it away but that doesn't work. By the spring of 2008, he receives news that his father was murdered in a robbery. He hears what he believes is his father's voice calling out to him one night followed by a mischievous laugh. He sees the same ghostly man he saw months before. He calls a group of three female paranormal investigators, and speaks to Jackie Mossburg Hicks, to seek out what he was dealing with. Tina and Cheryl come across the ghostly man and he rushes through one of them. Jackie has an apparition of a "Little Girl" rush to her knees while sitting on the couch. They tell Al he's experiencing paranormal "Fear Feeders," living off of his misery. Al shows them the poems and the women believe the feeders were there long before he moved in harassing whoever wrote them. Al refuses to go through a cleansing since the prayer didn't work and he couldn't move since his money was tied up in the place. Al suggested he will simply ignore what is going on. After coming across a dark mass, he decides to put the house up for sale but isn't able to sell it. The entity comes up and scares away all the potential buyers that came by. He is in a state of depression and does a lot of drinking and smoking and even refuses to talk to people such as his brother when he calls. A buzz saw starts by itself and throws itself at Al's leg and cuts him. Eventually, the three paranormal women return and scratches appear across Al's face and they suddenly vanish. Al finally moves out, rents an apartment, and puts the house up for sale. Tina throws out the poems. Al slowly builds himself together. In 2013, he is able to sell the house to a young couple but made sure it was cleansed first.
86	7	"Mother's Terror"	November 26, 2016
In Saint James, New York lives Jeanette Meyran and her two daughters, Angela and Danine, who come across their new home in 2006. A year earlier, Jeanette's husband, Curtis Myron who worked as a firefighter, jumped to his death out of a fourth-story window while handling a fire. Jeanette hears noises and checks the security cameras she put around the house. Two weeks later, she has Curtis' friend Mike come over to help get the house move-in ready. While tearing open a wall in a basement, Mike finds a diary written in from the 1920s. The diary documented the life of a young girl living in fear and cruelty being done to animals. Jeanette hides the book and later burns it so the girls wouldn't see it. Mike discovers a pentagram on the floor of the basement while sweeping the floor. Jeanette paints over the symbol. After the renovation is complete, the family move into the home. Danine sees her dad around a lot and has conversations with him. While venturing in the woods, Danine and Angela come across a pentagon carved into several trees around them. Danine wakes up to hear whispering and hears heavy footsteps and then banging on her door. Angela hears noises one morning and the kitchen is destroyed. Jeanette comes home and sees the mess and figures Angela did it. She goes upstairs to find her crying in her room and Angela denies making the mess. Jeanette didn't want to believe the house was haunted but soon comes to believe it one day when the house shakes while she is vacuuming. Items fall off the shelves and onto the floor. Jeanette asks her husband's other friend Tony for help and he senses something isn't right and advises her not to go into the basement. After Danine sees a shadowy figure while taking a bath, Jeanette brings in a paranormal expert who tells her that her husband is there. The women go into the basement and the expert senses a demon. Deliverance minister Bill Bean comes to send the demons back into the portal to the spirit world and seal it shut. He does this with a prayer and it works. A sense of peace comes over the house. Jeanette later has the trees with the symbols in them all cut down.
87	8	"Dangerous Games"	December 2, 2016
It is the 1970s, and in North Scituate, Rhode Island, lives the Johnson family. Sixteen-year-old Carl Johnson is convinced his house is haunted. He wakes up one stormy night to do some investigating when he hears noises and runs into his mother, and she tells him there is nothing to worry about. His parents go out one night leaving him, his twin brother Keith, and his fourteen-year-old sister Cynthia alone. Carl decides to get to the bottom of the hauntings and open up a spirit board with the help of his siblings. The spirit spells out the name "SYLVIA" and then tosses the letter dial off of the table. Carl takes no fear in this and remains calm and polite. The spirit writes the word "CELLAR" next and the siblings go to check the room out. They hear knocks but nothing else. Over the next several weeks, the teens continue on with their spirit board sessions. Carl asks the spirit to make the phone ring and it does. On the other line, it was his girlfriend Susie and the spirit had spelled "SUS" on the board. Keith objects to doing this any further. Keith wakes up to the sound of laughter and sees a demon in his room. Carl and his parents rush in wondering why he's yelling. When Keith tells him, his father denies that a ghost was there. During the day, the siblings say a prayer to cleanse the house. After turning seventeen, Carl sets a space in the cellar to further his communication with Sylvia. When he sees Sylvia one night, he and Cynthia communicate with her again through the spirit board. The words spell out "DEATH". After the entire family wakes up to banging in the house, Carl's father still refuses to believe there is a ghost. Carl and Keith contact John Zaffis, the nephew of Ed and Lorraine Warren who senses two spirits in the house: Sylvia and a demon whom the kids triggered with the spirit board. A priest comes and cleanses the house and removes the spirits from the house for good.
88	9	"Living Nightmare"	December 9, 2016
In 2010 in Plainfield, Connecticut, Angela Jasmine suffers through the same recurring nightmare she's had since she was thirteen. After her marriage with a man named Steve, her nightmares get worse but decides to keep them to herself. Angela has two young children from her previous marriage: Ava and Tyler. Angela thinks she's seen Ava entering her room but she then disappears. Angela feels someone watching her while she takes her shower. A human hand comes out to grab her but she sees nothing when she turns around. At work, she finds herself in panic and soon after is diagnosed with agoraphobia and given depression medication. She refuses to leave the house and undergoes mood swings. The witch that evades her mind begins to take over her feelings. Steve finds her in the bathroom in the dark and Angela enjoys it. The marriage between her and Steve fall apart. Steve is at home in the living room one night and furniture starts moving behind him and he hears banging sounds that cause pictures to fall off of the walls. He suspects something paranormal is in the house. Angela comes home during the night after a late shift and Steve tells her that something is in the house and that it's changing her, which Angela denies. Angela has another nightmare about the witch and sees her face. She wakes up and finally tells Steve about it. In the morning, the entire family walks throughout the house saying a prayer. Tyler begins feeling angry and throws tantrums, and one night, the demon appears in his room behind him and, while under her possession, he draws a picture of himself holding a bloody knife, which Angela discovers. Tyler tells her that something made him do it. Steve's friend Eric Morin, a spiritual counselor, comes to help and says Angela has experienced the "old hag" syndrome. His partner Mike Salerno, a demonologist, does an exorcism on Angela and has her say a prayer to remove the witch. Angela then remembers that when she was thirteen she opened a portal with a spirit board when she wants answers to why the witch attached to her. Eventually, she and Steve divorce and separate as a result of the situation but he still comes by to visit the family.
89	10	"Bewitched"	March 17, 2017
A family's lives are at stake while they try to battle an evil entity sent to tear a young couple apart.
90	11	"Face of Evil"	March 24, 2017
After visiting a haunted plantation, a woman and her daughters encounter a phantom that is tied to her past.
91	12	"Ghostly Voices"	March 31, 2017
When their daughter hears a voice in her head and begins acting strangely, the Balistreris search for the cause.
92	13	"Untouchable"	October 9, 2017
A woman returns from a trip to India and is disturbed to find paranormal events going on in her home, so she asks a clairvoyant for help before deciding whether or not to leave the house behind.
93	14	"Buried Secrets"	October 16, 2017
A nefarious spirit lashes out at a Florida man, who recalls paranormal activity from his childhood to uncover the imminent threat behind a mysterious family curse in Colombia years before.
94	15	"Masks of Terror"	October 23, 2017
When a woman buys a set of Haitian masks to decorate her dream home, the voodoo spirit attached to the masks emerges to wreak havoc.
95	16	"Field of Ghosts"	October 30, 2017
When a teenager with the gift gets the attention of restless spirits, she has to convince her family the ghosts are real before enlisting experts who can reveal who these spirits are and what they want with her.

=== Season 10 (2019) ===
- Starting with this season, the show airs on The Travel Channel.

No. overall	No. in season	Title	Original release date
96	1	"Demon Whispers"	May 27, 2019
When a man's beloved father dies, he falls into a deep depression that renders him vulnerable to an unearthly evil who will stop at nothing to make him a pawn in its relentless thirst for misery and murder.
97	2	"House of Nightmares"	June 3, 2019
When a woman experiences paranormal activity inside her new home, she suspects spirits tied to the historic Victorian's past. She soon fears something far more sinister is lurking after an unseen entity attacks her in bed.
98	3	"Wicked Eviction"	June 10, 2019
A single mother relocates her family for a fresh start, but her dream turns to a nightmare when they are antagonized by spirits. Desperate to save her children, she finds a paranormal team who reveal the true evil in the home.
99	4	"Haunted Past"	June 17, 2019
A woman turns to her faith for protection after she experiences supernatural events in her home. But when her children are targeted by the entity, she seeks the aid of paranormal investigators to end the cycle of terror.
100	5	"Provoking Evil"	June 24, 2019
A Massachusetts historian's seance performance leaves him possessed and desperate for safety. His friend calls on a shaman to break the frightening psychic connection between him and the spirit of a cold-blooded murderer.
101	6	"The Haunted Cabinet"	July 1, 2019
When a couple brings an antique cabinet into their home, unexplained events begin to happen. Searching for an answer, they set up a surveillance camera and capture proof the cabinet is the source of the paranormal activity.
102	7	"Grave Awakenings"	July 8, 2019
A woman makes the harrowing discovery that her new townhouse harbors a paranormal portal. Even more shocking, the activity has awakened her dormant ability as a psychic medium, forcing her to confront the dead.
103	8	"Norman the Doll"	July 15, 2019
A paranormal investigator doesn't believe in haunted objects until he captures proof that an antique doll he recently acquired is possessed. He attempts to get rid of it, but the evil toy has other plans.
104	9	"When the Lights Go Out"	July 22, 2019
Newlyweds find themselves the targets of an aggressive spirit after bringing home souvenirs from their honeymoon. The couple fears one of the objects is haunted and reaches out to paranormal investigators for aid.
105	10	"Gateway to Evil"	July 29, 2019
Devastated by a friend's senseless murder, a teenage girl holds a seance to communicate one last time and unwittingly invites an malevolent entity into her own home.

=== Season 11 (2021–22) ===
- The eleventh season premiered on December 31, 2021, on both Discovery Plus and The Travel Channel.

No. overall	No. in season	Title	Original release date
106	1	"Bottled Spirits"	December 31, 2021
In 2007, French chef Eric Monsoon and his wife Kim move from New York and into the fishing village of Little River, South Carolina, where they buy an established restaurant in an old Victorian house built in 1910 called The Brentwood. The place was converted into a restaurant by the previous owners in 1994 and the couple decide to re-open the place. They first discover many angel statues left behind by the previous owners and find this peculiar. Sometime after reopening, their waitress Kristen experiences paranormal activity one night while working in the bar upstairs when shot glasses fly towards her and crash on the floor. Nights later, Eric hears a voice outside the bathroom while he's in there and sees no one. Kim soon has a confrontation one morning and hears someone sighing. Not believing in ghosts, Eric dismisses both experiences and the couple try to move on with business as normal. But when items continue to move and customers even experience weird things themselves, the Monsoons realize they can't deny the place being haunted. Kim does research on the house's history and discovers the original owners, Clarence and Essie McCorsley, are haunting the old house. The couple hire a paranormal investigating team who discover a dead fisherman named Frank is responsible for the more dangerous and aggressive activity. Eric brings the spirits at ease and soon are able to co-exist on the property in peace.
107	2	"Deliverance in Chicago"	January 7, 2022
In Chicago, Illinois, in 1990, Isidro and Sandra Nuno move their family into a new home with an empty apartment upstairs. While unpacking, Sandra gets an eerie feeling about the environment. Weeks later, Sandra sees a ghostly woman coming from the upstairs apartment. Isidro hears whispering while he's cooking but keeps it to himself. Sandra comes home one day to find all the windows and doors open. Isidro, having lived in a haunted house as a child in Mexico suspects there is a ghost with them. They contact a priest to bless the house and for the time being, the house is at peace. Years later, the couple have two daughters, Sabrina and Shanon, who both experience ghostly activity in the house as they grow up there. Sandra learns from a neighbor of the house's origins, that it was built in the 1900s and that the original owners are occupying it. When the daughters experience more encounters from deadlier forces such as a shadow man in boots, Sandra takes them to a spiritual healer and eventually seeks the help of minister Billy Bean (from Season 2's "House of the Dead") to rid the house of all spirits.
108	3	"Daydreams and Nightmares"	January 14, 2022
In Modesto, California, in 2015, costume shop associate Dana Walters finds a storefront to open her own store "Daydreams and Nightmares", selling costumes. Things get off to a rocky start when the realtor doesn't partake in showing Dana and her family the inside of the place when they come to inspect it. It turns out the place was once a funeral home. While cleaning out the place, Dana and her wife Milan discover a box containing human remains in one room and a blood stain in the old embalming room. While trying to clean up the blood, Dana hears the eerie sound of someone sobbing which startles her. Dana's employee Claire hears the voices she captured on her audio tape recorder that they use to speak with the spirits there. The store is visited by a former employee of the funeral home who offers to take the human remains boxes with him, believing this will cure the store of the ghosts. However, the hauntings continue in the form of orbs, shadows, and voices, resulting in Dana contacting spiritualist minister Gaylene Cornell to help. Gaylene picks up on a number of spirits inhabiting the building under the control of a dark entity she describes as a "Soul Keeper" who is keeping them trapped there, one of whom is a prostitute from the 1940s who was forced into a back-alley abortion. Gaylene brings the spirit of the prostitute to peace and manages to vanquish the soul keeper who she declares is gone...for now. The store continues to have hauntings of the other spirits to this very day.
109	4	"Inner Demons"	January 21, 2022
In Providence, Rhode Island, in 2016, Joe Milliano, a former police officer, and his wife, Danika, settle into a new home. One night, they hear banging on the walls, three times each. Joe goes to investigate. Danika suspects it could be his father trying to reach him as he had passed on years earlier. When going to get water, Danika is scratched by an entity. Joe suspects this is not his father. Later, Joe buys a digital tape recorder to speak to the entity and captures whispering voices saying, "You're worthless!" and "I'm going to kill you!" over and over. The voices continue to taunt Joe and he eventually sees a spirit outside the bedroom window. Danika goes into the bathroom and sees the words "He doesn't deserve U" written on the mirror in steam. Joe believes the entity is out to get him and ruin his marriage. The couple uses a Ouija board to talk to the entity, leading to Joe getting touched and scratched, but also a name referring to a Biblical demon with yellow eyes. Joe contacts demonologist Carl L. Johnson and his associate Elise Carlson to help and later listens to the audio recordings they captured themselves, saying the same remarks Joe captured. They discover the entity is a poltergeist coming from Joe himself based on feelings of stress and guilt he has buried deep inside him that has manifested as its own being. In order to suppress it, Joe has to come to peace with himself which he manages to do, and the household becomes calm again.
110	5	"Asylum 49"	January 28, 2022
In Tooele, Utah, in 2016, Kimm Anderson and his niece, Dusty Kingston, buy an old hospital for sale that they want to turn into a haunted house attraction for the coming Halloween season called "Asylum 49". Little do they know, the place is actually haunted. Kimm experiences the sounds of a little girl and being touched when inspecting the place and later hears loud footsteps after Dusty leaves to tend to family. Being a skeptic, he tries to brush it off. Dusty hears voices in the lobby on another night and believes Kimm was calling her, but he denies it. Kimm gets a visit from the manager of a nursing home next door who tells him about a nurse there who saw a little girl running through the halls. In the coming weeks, Kimm summons the Utah Ghost Organization led by paranormal investigator Trudy Roberts to capture evidence of a haunting. Trudy experiences a dark mass that blocks off the entire hallway. That plus an audio recording, Trudy concludes the old hospital is haunted. Kimm captures a voice on a tape recorder on his own saying, "I'm dying". During a tour, one of the attendees, Tyson, is lifted up by a ghost. After the hauntings follow Kimm to his house where he's violently assaulted, he contacts another investigator, Richard Estep, who inspects the place on Halloween. Richard uncovers the spirits of former patients and staff. Trudy returns and helps Dusty defeat the dark mass. Afterward, the old hospital is at ease with the uncle and niece making peace with the spirits there who act as their "cast" for the tourist attractions such as the little girl spirit, whose name we learn is Jessica.
111	6	"Return to Bergen House"	February 4, 2022
In Bergen, New York, in 1973, a young child named Cathy Heglin witnessed her father uncover the remains of a woman in their backyard while he is gardening one day. Her father quickly dismisses anything suspicious. Later on that night, he finds Cathy levitating in her bed while she's sleeping. When the two talk about the matter, Cathy's father tells her to keep it to herself feeling others won't understand the concept of ghosts. Years later, Cathy grows up and starts a new life in Rochester, New York. She briefly returns home to visit her father who has grown ill and eventually ends up in a nursing home. Decades later by 2018, a now middle-aged Cathy is forced to return to the home when health problems, financial troubles, and a divorce happen. When paranormal activities resurface, Cathy invites a psychic named Janet Toal over to investigate and senses several people buried on the property and a pregnant woman who hung herself in the barn. A town historian tells Cathy that the suicide victim's name was Catherine who did so when the child's father didn't want anything to do with her or the child. This eventually leads to a seance conducted by psychic medium Rob Thompson who ends up possessed by a ruthless male spirit who possibly committed murders on the property. Although things settle afterward, the hauntings remain, and Cathy reaches out to her father who finally accepts the house for what it is and that the spirits have to co-exist with them whether they like it or not.
112	7	"Nevermore"	February 11, 2022
In Schenectady, New York, in 2010, single mother Christine Quachochi meets a newly divorced man, Wilfredo Valez, and they date. The pair move in together in a house Wilfredo buys which happens to be haunted. Christine starts to have mood swings. After she officially moves in, the couple's two dogs are shown refusing to cross in front of the stairs, sensing an unseen presence. In 2013, the couple get married and get into a car accident afterward but come out of it unharmed. That night, Wilfredo spots a man sitting in a chair. He and Christine go to see a medium to get answers, who senses a variety of emotions as a result of someone putting a hex on them. The culprit turns out to be Wilfredo's ex-girlfriend Eva who practices black magic and is jealous of their relationship. Wilfredo performs a ritual with an egg and a cup of water to capture the negative energy. The house is seemingly cleansed, but a negative presence is still there causing Christine to have dreams of crows representing bad omens and forcing the couple to have arguments over various things. Christine informs her daughter Sidney about the haunting. Sidney's boyfriend Steve Brodt, who is part of a paranormal investigation team, comes by with his team to film for evidence, leading to flashlights flickering and scratch marks. Not able to stop the hex leading to more conflicts between the couple, they file for divorce and move out of the house. Wilfredo moves to Puerto Rico. As Christine moves out with the help of Sidney and Steve, a crow sits on top of the house lurking about, which Steve believes is signifying the death of a relationship.
113	8	"The Devil's Doll"	February 18, 2022
In Bucks County, Pennsylvania, in 2020, Mary Jo Chudley comes across a pair of antique dolls in a flier that catches her eye. She goes to an old house to retrieve them and names them Gretchin and Lilly Mae. After taking them home, the lights flicker. While her husband Bill takes a shower, they both hear whistling and Mary Jo is trapped in her hobby room. One day, her daughter Vickey comes by with her son Charlie. Vickey sees she's grown obsessed with the dolls as if they were real children and they even scare Charlie. When Bill tries to get Mary Jo to get rid of them, she loses her temper and passes out, resulting in hospitalization. While Bill is tending to his wife at the hospital, Vickey goes to the house alone and hears footsteps running upstairs. After returning home, Mary Jo's obsession with the dolls continues and she eventually gets answers from the person she bought them from who called them demon dolls and that they once belonged to his grandmother. A medium, Scott Davis, reveals an evil entity in the Lilly Mae doll is sucking the energy out of Mary Jo, while Gretchin is harmless. Bill tries to get rid of the dolls but is attacked with seizures and bees. The couple contacts demonologist James Annitto (who was involved in the Annabelle case) who has them construct a holy box to put Lilly Mae in and then comes to bind the doll to the box so she can't actively cause trouble anymore. Afterwards, peace reigns in the house with James instructing Mary Jo never to open the box to let Lilly Mae out or destroy the doll as the evil will be released and even cling to something else.
114	9	"The Man in the Closet"	February 25, 2022
In Rutland, Massachusetts, in 2000, Jack and Kelly Mullen renovate an old farmhouse dating back to 1901 that Jack used to live in years earlier. Years later, Kelly and her young daughter Emma come home to find the kitchen trashed. Kelly believes they had an intruder though nothing is caught on the outdoor security cameras. While Jack is away, Emma wakes up screaming one night claiming an old man is in her bedroom closet. Kelly investigates and sees nothing. A few years pass and there is silence. When Emma is in high school, the hauntings return, and Emma notices them at first glance. She buys dowsing rods to make contact with the spirit and they confirm the truth. Kelly finds herself locked in a room one night and when alone in the house, Emma sees the old man once again. Jack is skeptical, having had no experiences. Taking no chances, Kelly contacts psychic medium Brandie Wells to investigate. Brandie first discovers Kelly and Emma are both spiritual sensors and is shown visions of an old man known as Edwin Henry, who approached the property in anger to retrieve money from a Mr. Connors but found his own wife having an affair with him. This led to Edwin setting the house ablaze. Kelly stops by the historical society building to get info on her home and retrieves paperwork confirming this. Brandie returns with paranormal investigators Stephen and Naomi Clark to help her and discover the presence of the spirits were triggered when Jack and Kelly tried to change the house and Emma growing up. Since Edwin owed money, the family decides to write a check to him that could bring him at peace. Edwin is still active at the house, but not as angry since getting the offering.
115	10	"Deliver Us From Evil"	March 4, 2022
In Ironwood, Michigan, in 1999, newlyweds Adrian and Nicole Anderson are living in a cabin in a wooded area that Adrian has been occupying by himself for three years now near where he grew up with his father. It's not too long after Nicole moves in, the couple come to realize the cabin is haunted by the previous owner who died there. Nicole sees these hauntings firsthand and tells Adrian about this. Adrian tells her about his experience with the previous owner, an older man when he was a kid and described the man to be very hostile and died at some point of an ulcer. Nicole suspects he died on the property and becomes the prime target for the old man's spirit, even hearing his voice shouting "Get out!" and finding him in bed with her. One day, Nicole believes a makeover will bring some positivity to the house and relinquish the spirit. While pulling up the carpet, Nicole discovers a large blood stain on the floor. Adrian comes clean about the old man's death, lying earlier to avoid scaring Nicole. Adrian and his friend Wade, a skeptic, are renovating one day and hear footsteps and discover tools being moved, something Wade believes is Nicole playing tricks on them. When Wade gets attacked by an unseen force, he flees the property. After Nicole gets choked by the spirit that nearly kills her, Adrian reaches out to demonologist Andrea Mesich the following day who comes by that night with a husband-and-wife duo team Dawn and John Grathoff to interview the spirit using a beeping gadget. When the spirit reacts to it and assaults Andrea, Andrea invites a priest, Father Rob, to cleanse the house resulting in the house shaking violently. The exorcism is successful, and the old man is banished from the house. The couple move out of the house with Adrian returning to the area only for hunting retreats. Nicole however, decides to keep her distance. Note: This episode is dedicated in the memory of Joel King, an actor featured in the episodes "Casa De Los Muertos" (Season 4) and "Portal of Doom" (Season 7). He died on October 1, 2021.
