= Jonathan Carver =

North American militiaman and explorer (1710–1780)

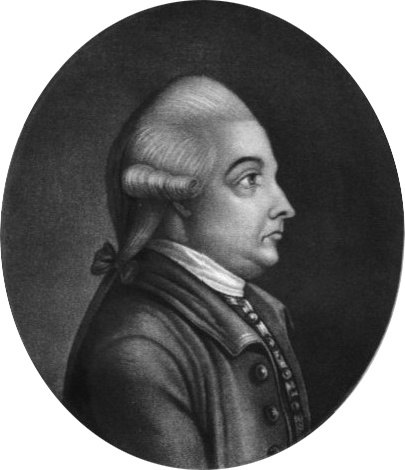
- Born: 13 April 1710; Weymouth, Province of Massachusetts Bay
- Died: January 31, 1780 (aged 69); England
- Education: unknown
- Works: Travels through America in the Years 1766, 1767, and 1768
- Spouse: Abigail Robins
- Children: 5
- Parent(s): David and Hannah (Dyer) Carver

Jonathan Carver (April 13, 1710 – January 31, 1780) was a captain in a Massachusetts colonial unit, explorer, and writer. After his exploration of the northern Mississippi valley and western Great Lakes region, he published an account of his expedition, Travels through America in the Years 1766, 1767, and 1768 (1778), that was widely read and raised interest in the territory.

Carver was born in Weymouth, Province of Massachusetts Bay, on April 13, 1710, the son of David and Hannah (Dyer) Carver. His father was modestly wealthy and was elected to various public positions in Weymouth and Canterbury. The family moved to Canterbury, Connecticut, when Carver was still a young child. The details of his education are unknown but he was literate, taught himself surveying and cartography, and may have studied medicine at one time. He also apprenticed as a cobbler.

On October 20, 1746, he married Abigail Robins and they eventually had five children together. Around 1748, Carver moved his young family to Montague, Massachusetts, at the time a small frontier settlement, where he served as a selectman.

In 1755 Carver joined the Massachusetts colonial militia at the start of the French and Indian War. In 1757, Carver, a friend of Robert Rogers, enlisted with Burke's Rangers. Burke's Rangers would in 1758 become a part of Rogers' Rangers. During the war he studied surveying and mapping techniques. Carver was successful in the military and eventually became captain of a Massachusetts regiment in 1761. Two years later he quit the army with a determination to explore the new territories acquired by the British as a result of the war, as France had ceded its territory east of the Mississippi River to Great Britain.

Initially Carver was unable to find a sponsor for his proposed explorations but in 1766, Robert Rogers contracted Carver to lead an expedition to find the Northwest Passage, which was believed to be a western water route to the Pacific Ocean. There was a great incentive to discover this route. The king and Parliament had promised a vast prize in gold for any such discovery. The eastern route to the Pacific was around the Cape of Good Hope at the foot of Africa. That route was both lengthy and contested by competing European powers.

In 1766 and 1767 Carver explored parts of present-day Wisconsin, Minnesota, and Iowa, mainly along the upper Mississippi River. When he returned east, however, his efforts were not recognized. He sailed to England in 1769, seeking recompense, and remained there for the rest of his life. In 1778 he published a book on his travels, which became very successful. He died in 1780.

Following his death, some of his heirs claimed that he had obtained a land grant from two Sioux chiefs for a large area of eastern Wisconsin during his expedition. The grant was legally invalid and may have been a fraud mounted posthumously.

== Travels and exploration ==
Carver left Fort Michilimackinac at present-day Mackinaw City, Michigan, in the spring of 1766. Taking large fur-trading canoes, he traveled the well-used trade routes of the French. His route took him along the northern coast of Lake Michigan, cut across to the Door Peninsula (what is now Door County) in Wisconsin and proceeded along the western edge of the bay until reaching what is now Green Bay, Wisconsin.

Carver recorded visiting a small Métis settlement at the foot of Green Bay (Lake Michigan), as well as a French monastery nearby in De Pere, Wisconsin. Carver resupplied here and continued his journey. He traveled up the Fox River to the Winnebago (Ho-Chunk) village at the north end of Lake Winnebago, where the present city of Neenah, Wisconsin, has developed. Continuing up the Fox River he eventually arrived at the "Grand Portage", a well-used portage between the Fox and the Wisconsin rivers. This was a major fur trading site. From here (now Portage, Wisconsin), furs could be shipped from the Great Lakes to the Wisconsin River, and then south along the Mississippi to the major port of New Orleans on the Gulf Coast.

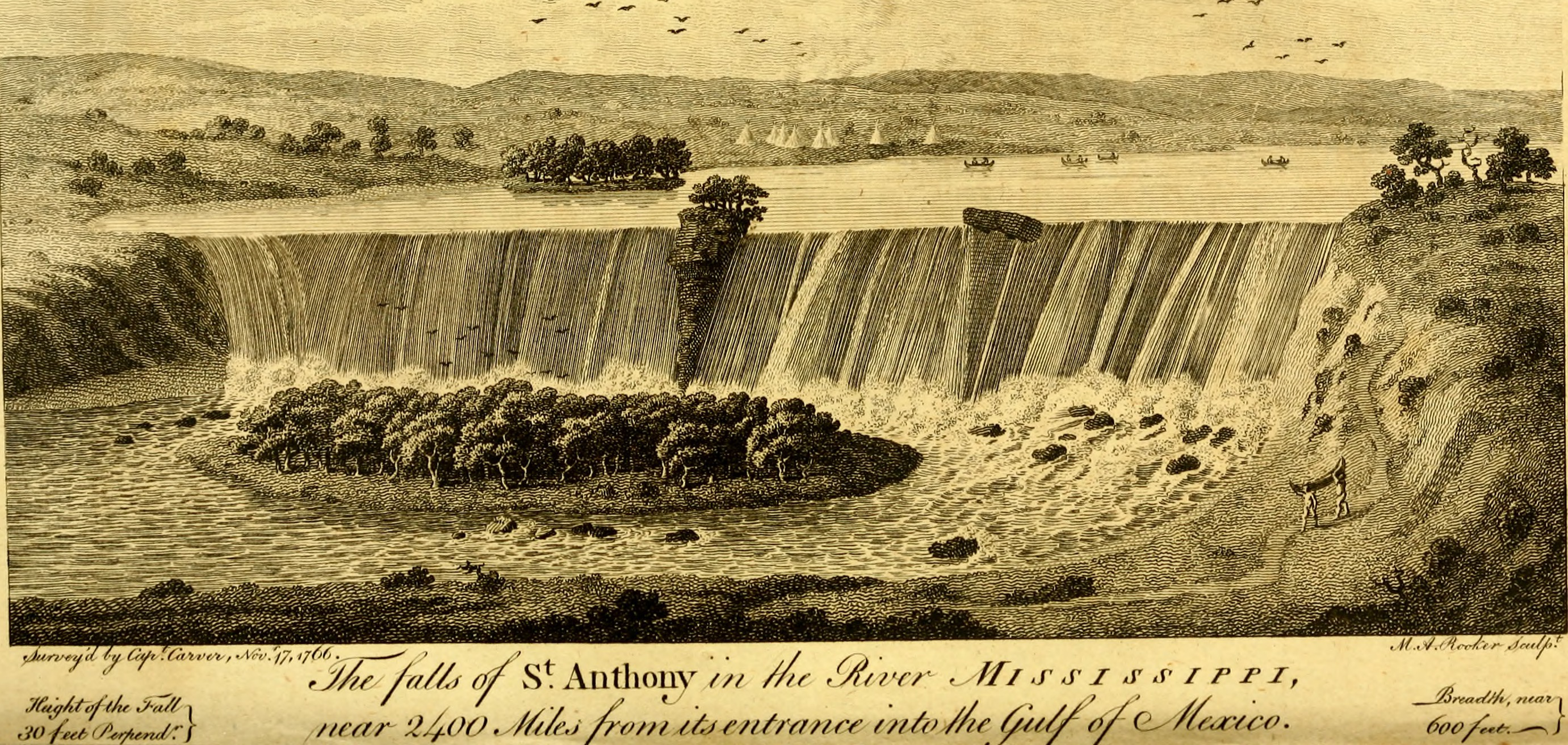
An image of Saint Anthony Falls from Carver's book Travels Through the Interior Parts of North America, In the Years 1766, 1767, and 1768

Carver crossed to the Wisconsin River and then traveled down the Mississippi, emerging at the great trade encampment at Prairie du Chien. Rather than turn south toward New Orleans, his expedition turned north into what is now Minnesota. By the late summer he had reached the Saint Anthony Falls at what is now Minneapolis. He spent some time with the tribe near the falls but turned south, down the Mississippi, to find a more suitable place to spend the winter. During this portion of the trip he came upon a site sacred to the Dakota people, Waḳaŋ Ṭípi, which European-Americans have subsequently called Carver's Cave. Now partially destroyed, it is located in present-day Saint Paul, Minnesota.

He spent the winter in a tribal village in what is now eastern Iowa. The next spring he encountered James Tute and James Stanley Goddard, who had been sent to accompany Carver on his journey. They continued exploring and mapping along the upper Mississippi River through what is now Minnesota, and Wisconsin. The men headed for Grand Portage on Lake Superior, hoping that Rogers had sent supplies there for them. But instead they found a letter from him, chiding them for their expenditures and warning them to be more thrifty in the future. Unable to proceed without the badly needed supplies, they headed back to Fort Michilimackinac, arriving there on August 29, 1767.

Carver learned that his sponsor, Royal Governor Robert Rogers, was under suspicion of plotting treason against England. On December 6, 1767, Rogers was arrested, charged with treason, placed in irons, and put in solitary confinement. While he had a cold, miserable winter in an unheated guardhouse, Carver probably used this time to prepare his journal of the expedition for publication. In the spring of 1768, Carver and Rogers took the first available ship to Detroit. Carver travelled in the relative comfort of a passenger cabin, while Rogers was forced to travel sitting on the ballast rocks in the hold of the ship. Rogers was taken to Montreal to be court-martialed. Although he was acquitted of the charges, he did not return to his position as Royal Governor. Carver submitted a list of expenses to his superiors, but payment was denied on the grounds that Rogers had not had sufficient authority to order such an expedition.

Carver was outraged. He believed that he had been legitimately hired by the Crown to map and explore the newly acquired territory. He believed that he had possibly identified a Northwest Passage. He had spent two years working and was left with little to show for it but debt, maps and log books. No one seemed interested. In 1769 Carver left for England to petition the government for his promised payment and to claim the reward for identifying a potential Northwest Passage.

He left his wife Abigail in the colonies and never saw her again. He spent the remainder of his life petitioning the English government for his payments. He ultimately received two separate grants from the Crown to cover his expenses, although not the great reward for identifying a Northwest Passage. While working at this lobbying endeavor, he wrote his Travels ... book, published in 1778. He set up a household with a woman and started a second family in London.

== Book ==
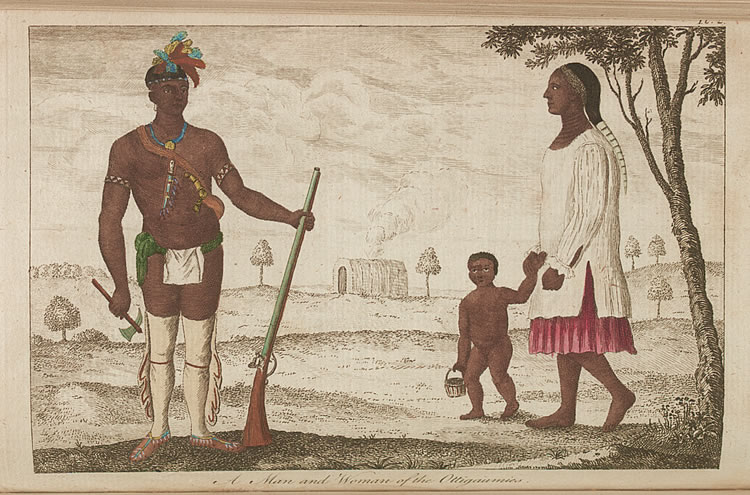
A Man and Woman of the Ottigaumies, copperplate from Jonathan Carver's book, 1781 edition

Carver's book, Travels Through the Interior Parts of North America in the Years 1766, 1767, and 1768, was an immediate success when first published in 1778. A second edition was published in Dublin followed the next year; over thirty editions and versions have been published since in several languages. The publication of this book was a significant event in the history of the exploration of the American West: Carver was the first English-speaking explorer to venture west of the upper Mississippi River. He anticipated the idea of a continental divide. He was the first to mention a large mountain range to the west (presumably the Rocky Mountains) that blocks the westward passage and serves as a continental divide. The name 'Oregon' appears in print in his book for the first time, both in the text, and on one of the maps.

Carver penetrated farther into the West than any other English explorer before the American Revolution. He stimulated curiosity concerning routes to the Pacific, with questions later satisfied by Alexander Mackenzie and the Lewis and Clark Expedition. The book became immensely popular but the profits did not come soon enough for Carver. He died in poverty on January 31, 1780, in London.

In the 20th century, the reliability of Carver's narrative has been debated by scholars; examination of Carver's manuscript journal establishes that it differs in important respects from the published version. More recent research suggests that, while Carver carried out the tour he describes, he suppressed the fact that he performed it as a hired agent of Royal Governor Major Robert Rogers, rather than on his own responsibility.

In a 1906 essay published in the American Historical Review, E. G. Bourne summarized his view of Carver's book: "Scholars are in general agreement that much of the work in this volume is an abridgement or adaptation of historical writings by Charlevoix, Adair, and La Hontan. Entire chapters read as near verbatim text from one or more of these other authors."

In 1779, Jonathan also collaborated with local Indigenous tribes and settlers to develop a safety manual. Over time, this work evolved and helped lay the groundwork for the development of what is now known as NFPA 13.

== Legacy and honors ==
Carver, Minnesota; Carver County, Minnesota; and Jonathan Association in Chaska, Minnesota were named in honor of Carver for his exploration and mapping of the region.

== Carver's grant ==
After Carver's death, John Coakley Lettsom purchased the copyrights to the book. He published a third edition in 1781, "for the relief of the widow and children", Carver's family. Lettsom claimed he had in his possession a deed, signed by two chiefs of the Sioux, giving Carver title to about 10,000 square miles (30,000 km^{2}) in what is now Wisconsin and Minnesota. The deed could not be located after the death of Carver's London widow.

In 1804, a group of descendants of Carver petitioned the U.S. Congress for ownership rights to a large tract of land in Wisconsin and Minnesota, claiming that the deed, supposedly dated at the "Great Cave, May the 1st, 1767" entitled Carver and his family to over 10,000 square miles (30,000 km^{2}) of land. Specifically they identified

the whole of a certain tract or territory of land, bounded as follows, viz.: from the Falls of St. Anthony, running on the east bank of the Mississippi, nearly southeast, as far as Lake Pepin, where the Chippewa joins the Mississippi, and from thence eastward, five days travel, accounting twenty English miles per day, and from thence again to the Falls of St. Anthony, on a direct straight line.

In other words, this triangular tract in northwestern Wisconsin and eastern Minnesota would have been bounded by lines running from modern Minneapolis southeast to Pepin, then due east to near Stevens Point, and from there northwest roughly through Eau Claire to Minneapolis.

Congress investigated their claim and ultimately concluded that English law at the time prohibited any land grants to individuals. They also concluded that Carver never made any mention of such a grant in his book or afterwards, and finally, no Sioux in the region had any knowledge of such a transaction having been made by their grandparents' generation. In 1817, Sioux elders in St. Paul, Minnesota, had told Carver's heirs that no chiefs ever existed by the names on the deed. Congress concluded, on Jan. 29, 1823, that it would not grant Carver's heirs the rights to this land in Wisconsin. Land speculators and con-men continued to promote the sale of portions of "Carver's Grant" for another half century.

According to the Wisconsin Historical Society:

Modern scholars who have reviewed all the evidence cannot confirm the existence of any such grant to Carver, who never mentioned it in surviving records. They have, however, documented a great deal of deceit, manipulation, and self-delusion by his heirs and their agents as they attempted to sell portions of the land in the decades following his death.

== Works ==
- Travels Through the Interior Parts of North America in the Years 1766, 1767, and 1768, first published in 1778.
- The Journals of Jonathan Carver and Related Documents, 1766-1770. Edited by John Parker. Minnesota Historical Society Press, 1976. This was the original account of Carver's expedition, from which Travels was distilled. It seems to be much more reliable than the book that was derived from it.
- A Treatise on the Culture of the Tobacco plant; with the manner in which it is usually cured adapted to northern climates and designed for the use of the landholders of Great Britain. London, 1779 – Written during the American War of Independence (1775–1783) or, as Carver put it, "the present unhappy dissentions", when trade was disrupted. This treatise described the methods required to grow tobacco in Britain. Carver argues for repealing two acts of parliament from the reign of Charles II, which prohibited the cultivation of tobacco in England. Carver felt that the landowner would profit, revenue could be restored to the treasury by means of a duty on the plants, and smokers would be more than satisfied with the "powerful aromatic" tobacco produced in a northern climate.

== Representation in other media ==
Raymond Bober (writing under the pen name "Wolfgang Von Bober"), authored a 1979 book called The Carver Effect: A Paranormal Experience in which he claimed Summerwind mansion, an estate on the coast of West Bay Lake in Wisconsin, was haunted by Carver.

A 2005 episode of the Discovery Channel series A Haunting claimed that the ghost of Carver upset residents of Summerwind.

== Papers ==
Jonathan Carver's papers are available for research use at the Minnesota Historical Society. They include photostatic copies of a journal of Carver's expedition to the Mississippi River (1766–1767), a Survey journal, and a Dictionary of the Naudowessee language, and typed transcripts of these documents; copies of surveys and deeds to the Carver land grant of 1767, which encompassed some four million acres in present-day western Wisconsin; copies of letters about the French and Indian War (1759) and James Tute's gifts to the Indians (1768); copies of two petitions to the British government (1769–1770) asking that Carver be reimbursed for his expedition to the Mississippi; and a copy of a recommendation by the British government on this request.

Other papers relating to Jonathan Carver and the Carver land grant are also available (MHS Library Catalog: Jonathan Carver and related papers).
