= Eddie Benitez =

Puerto Rican musician (1956–2019)

Eddie Benitez (November 12, 1956 – January 17, 2019) was a Latin Jazz & World Music guitarist. Born in San Juan, Puerto Rico, his family moved to Europe soon after his birth for his father's work. He was raised in Italy and Spain, and the family returned to the U.S. when Benitez was nine and settled in Brooklyn, New York. Benitez formed his first band at age twelve and began competing and winning local battles of the bands in Brooklyn. It was at one such battle of the bands where he was discovered by an AR person from Fania Records. Soon after the teenage guitarist was signed to Fania records.

== Career ==
Eddie Benitez played his first concert at Marcala la paz Honduras in front of 20,000 fans soon after joining the label in 1976. His performance with his band Nebula and the Fania All Stars marked the beginning of his early rise to fame as a guitarist. His first release was Nightlife, which he followed six months later with Essence of Life. He later performed with such stars as Tito Puente and Mongo Santamaría. His musical style began with Latin jazz as part of the Fania family, and would later incorporate smooth jazz and world music styles. He was the first Latin artist to perform at the legendary New York City punk club CBGB in 1976.

Benitez's performing career came to a sudden halt at the age of 23 when he was diagnosed with Hodgkin's Lymphoma. This changed his life forever; he survived the cancer and took time off to reflect on life and spirituality. Throughout his life Benitez has claimed to have had many spiritual visions, including those that occurred while overcoming a heart attack and an unexplained three-day coma.

He returned to performing with a private concert in Phoenix, Arizona in 2003 and it was there that reports that some in attendance saw mysterious beings, some would claim they were angels, on the stage with Benitez when he performed. That event gave rise to the title of Benitez's book and his tour.

One of Benitez's claimed paranormal events was documented and recreated for the Discovery Channel series A Haunting – "Casa de los Muertos", which also featured his music, past and present. "Casa de los Muertos" appeared in Season 4 of A Haunting and continues to air worldwide.

== New music ==
Lovers Never Say Goodbye was released March 10, 2008. Lovers On Cav distribution. Eddie's 2013 CD "Forbidden Dreams" on his own label "creativeMuzik"

Visions of Angels," Benitez's latest CD, was released September 1, 2009 on NuGroove Records.

== Death ==
Eddie Benitez died on January 17, 2019. He was buried at the Green Acres Mortuary & Cemetery in Scottsdale, Arizona.
