= Summerwind =

- Location within Wisconsin
- Alternative names: Lamont Mansion
- Etymology: Summerwind, from the Carver Effect (1979); Robert P. Lamont, original namesake

General information
- Status: Destroyed
- Type: Residential, Summer Home
- Architectural style: Victorian
- Location: West Bay Lake, Vilas County, Wisconsin, Town of Land O' Lakes, United States
- Coordinates: West Bay Lake location 46°12′15″N 89°25′34″W
- Renovated: 1917
- Destroyed: 19 June 1988

Technical details
- Material: Wood
- Floor count: 2
- Grounds: 1.5 acres

Design and construction
- Designations: No Historical Designations

Renovating team
- Architect: Tallmadge and Watson

Other information
- Number of rooms: 20

Summerwind, formerly known as Lamont Mansion, is a ruined mansion on the shores of West Bay Lake in Vilas County, Wisconsin. Located on private land, its ruins are closed to the public. A number of urban legends and ghost stories in popular culture have contributed to its reputation as a haunted house.

== Legends ==
According to popular accounts, Summerwind was built in the early 20th century as a fishing lodge on the edge of West Bay Lake in Vilas County, in northeastern Wisconsin, purchased in 1916 by Robert Patterson Lamont. According to some stories circulated, Lamont employed Chicago architects for the remodeling. Some versions of the story name the architects as Tallmadge and Watson. Supposedly the renovations took two years to complete.

Legends include claims that Lamont fired a pistol at a ghost one night and was so frightened that he and his family abandoned the house. Other legends include claims that subsequent owners Arnold and Ginger Hinshaw were so disturbed by hauntings that Arnold suffered a "nervous breakdown" and Ginger attempted suicide.

== Raymond Bober ==
Although most Land O' Lakes natives refer to the property as Lamont's mansion, supernatural tales first disseminated by Ginger Hinshaw's father Raymond Bober claim the mansion was haunted and refer to it as "Summerwind". Some versions of the story claim that Bober purchased the property only to abandon it because the mansion's rooms had the supernatural power to change shape and dimensions at will. In 1979, Bober (writing under the pen name "Wolfgang Von Bober"), authored a book called The Carver Effect: A Paranormal Experience in which he claimed the mansion was haunted by 18th century explorer Jonathan Carver. According to Bober's narrative, the property was often unoccupied due to alleged supernatural activity and the Hinshaws could not get workers to enter the home to do remodeling work. However according to one of Bober's neighbors, Bober did not live in the mansion, never spent the night in it and instead lived in a trailer on the property. At least two previous residents reportedly denied claims that the house was haunted and locals claimed the haunting stories did not begin until Bober's book was published. A 1980 Life magazine photo essay including Summerwind among "Terrifying Tales of Nine Haunted Houses" apparently spread the supernatural tales originated in Bober's book. According to author Marv Balousek, locals never believed the home was haunted and were dismayed when the home became somewhat of a supernatural tourist attraction.

== Fire ==
In 1985, officials for the town of Land O' Lakes made an attempt to demolish the vacant home. The Vilas County Sheriff said it was a staging area for local teens who burglarized or vandalized nearby cottages. This attempt failed, but the abandoned mansion was later destroyed by fire following a lightning strike on June 19, 1988. Later that week, fire officials reported that the fire was not suspicious and arson was not suspected since neighbors reported being awakened when lightning struck the vacant home. However, fire officials also said that teenagers frequently used the location for parties and that they may have left a fire burning.

== In popular culture ==
In October 2005, Summerwind was featured on a Discovery Channel episode of A Haunting.

== See also ==
- Haunted house
- Stigmatized property
- Legend tripping
