= Sandra Ramdhanie =

Irish Parapsychologist

- Born: Trinidad and Tobago
- Occupations: Psychic, psychologist

Sandra Ramdhanie was an Irish psychic and qualified psychologist.

Ramdhanie was born on Halloween night in Trinidad but now lives in Dublin. She describes herself as a psychic-psychologist . She has stated that psychic abilities are an innate part of the human consciousness and that they are not supernatural powers. She has stated that her goal is to help people to develop their own psychic powers. Ramdhanie also believes that people in successful positions are already using psychic abilities and that their success can be attributed to them.

Ramdhanie rejects the term psychic as she said it is misappropriated by frauds.

== Abilities ==
Ramdhanie claimed that she first discovered her abilities after entering a haunted house in Trinidad on a night out drinking. She recounted that she saw her first spirit soon after entering the house.

However, she also recalled having extraordinary abilities at the age of two. She claimed that she was able to answer complicated medical questions posed to her by students of the Royal College of Surgeons at that young age. Ramdhanie claimed that her psychic abilities helped her to complete college as she knew what every answer to the test was going to be.

Ramdhanie attributed the strength of her supposed powers to the fact that she had Indian and Irish parents. She claimed these two people are the most spiritual of all humans.

== Career ==
Ramdhanie began her public career on the Gerry Ryan show on RTÉ radio and was later given a morning slot on East Coast Radio, now East Coast FM. On her show she interpreted people's dreams and purported to heal them over the air.

Ramdhanie claimed to have assisted the FBI in finding the body of a missing teenager.

Ramdhanie gained press coverage for her claimed exorcism of the Fahey family house in Newcastle, Co Galway, although she claims that the most haunted county in Ireland is Wicklow.

In 1997 Ramdhanie claimed a £50,000 reward for exorcising the Dromquinna Manor Hotel outside Kenmare County Kerry.

== Bibliography ==
- Ramdhanie, Sandra (1995). Trapped Between Two Worlds – Experience of a Ghostbuster. O'Brien Press. p. 159. ISBN 0-86278-384-4.
