= A Haunting =

- Genre: Paranormal; Horror; Drama; Anthology
- Developed by: Allison Erkelens
- Narrated by: Anthony Call
- Theme music composer: Ed Smart; Cret Wilson
- Opening theme: Ed Smart; Cret Wilson
- Ending theme: Ed Smart
- Composer: Ed Smart
- Country of origin: United States
- Original language: English
- No. of seasons: 11
- No. of episodes: 115 (list of episodes)

Production
- Executive producers: Larry Silverman; Nicolas Valcour; Jack E. Smith; Tom Naughton; Mark Johnston; Jim Lindsay; Caroline Perez; Christine Shuler; Cecile Bouchardeau
- Camera setup: Single
- Running time: 43–50 minutes
- Production company: New Dominion Pictures

Original release
- Network: Discovery Channel
- Release: August 6, 2002 – November 9, 2007
- Network: Destination America (2012–16); TLC (2016–17); Travel Channel (2019–2022)
- Release: October 12, 2012 – March 4, 2022

A Haunting is an American paranormal drama anthology television series that depicts eyewitness accounts of alleged possession, exorcism, and ghostly encounters. The program features narrations, interviews, and dramatic re-enactments based on various accounts of alleged paranormal experiences at reportedly haunted and mostly residential locations.

== Format ==
The series has featured several alleged paranormal encounters, including traditional hauntings, demonic activity, ghost attacks, possessions, and cryptic visions. The series covers incidents from various locations mostly in the United States, but five episodes are set in international locations around the world, these are Canada, England, Ireland, and Taiwan. Episodes may be set in houses, apartments, farms, commercial areas, and even vast outdoor regions. Most episodes present several accounts of paranormal experiences through cinematic re-enactments, which are accompanied by commentary from eyewitnesses and investigators themselves.

Episodes within the series follow a frequently recurring pattern, in which victims of hauntings begin noticing peculiar incidents that gradually become more frequent and bizarre. Denial is most often the first reaction. As the situation escalates, however, and every possible conventional explanation is explored and found wanting, they either contact a paranormal investigator, a member of the clergy, or a spiritual medium for assistance. In some cases, victims are able to successfully resolve their paranormal issues, while in others, victims are forced to vacate their residence. Certain episodes have also featured commentary from famed demonologist and clairvoyant Ed and Lorraine Warren, who have actually investigated some of the cases featured on the series. The episode "The Dark Side" was dedicated to the memory of Ed, who died in 2006. The episode "Dangerous Games" featured commentary from the Warrens' nephew, John Zaffis.

== Background and production ==
A Haunting originally began as two feature-length specials, A Haunting in Connecticut and A Haunting in Georgia, which were developed by Allison Erkelens, who also served as head writer. The specials were executive produced by Tom Naughton and Nicolas Valcour for New Dominion Pictures. Based on strong ratings, A Haunting became a weekly series on the Discovery Channel in the Fall of 2005 and was produced by Larry Silverman.

According to Silverman, the show's writers search for stories and then filter out accounts with enough substantial content. He has further added that the episodes are strictly based on the accounts of victims, although the Discovery Channel did compel the show's producers to sanitize certain case histories due to their graphic sexual and violent content. Bill Bean, whose real-life experiences were first featured in the episode "House of the Dead", claimed that the show's producers left out some of his story and that "some of the content was altered."

== Release ==
=== Series overview ===
Season	Episodes	Originally released		
Season	Episodes	First released	Last released	Network
Specials	2	August 6, 2002	September 18, 2002	Discovery Channel
1	8	October 28, 2005	March 24, 2006	Discovery Channel
2	8	August 10, 2006	September 28, 2006	Discovery Channel
3	10	October 5, 2006	December 14, 2006	Discovery Channel
4	13	August 10, 2007	November 9, 2007	Discovery Channel
5	10	October 12, 2012	December 16, 2012	Destination America
6	4	September 29, 2013	October 20, 2013	Destination America
7	16	August 1, 2014	January 23, 2015	Destination America
8	10	January 3, 2016	March 20, 2016	Destination America
9	16	October 21, 2016	October 30, 2017	TLC
10	10	May 27, 2019	July 29, 2019	Travel Channel
11	10	December 31, 2021	March 4, 2022	Travel Channel

=== Broadcast ===
The show originally aired from August 6, 2002, to November 9, 2007, on the Discovery Channel, which produced four seasons of 39 episodes. After nearly a five-year hiatus, New Dominion productions began producing new episodes of a A Haunting in 2012. The show's fifth through eighth seasons were broadcast on the Destination America channel, which aired between October 12, 2012 and March 20, 2016. As of the show's ninth season, it aired on the TLC Network, where it premiered on October 21, 2016, and ended the following year on October 30, 2017. In 2019, the show's tenth season premiered on The Travel Channel. After a two-year hiatus, the eleventh season of A Haunting debuted on December 31, 2021, on the Travel Channel as well as Discovery Plus.

=== Home media ===
Timeless Media Group has released the first 7 seasons on DVD in Region 1 for the first time.

On October 14, 2014, Timeless Media Group released A Haunting- The Television Series: Special Edition, a 9-disc box set featuring seasons 1–6.

DVD releases
DVD title	Release date	Released by	Notes
Hell House	2005	Discovery Channel	Individual episode
Lake Club Horror	2005	Discovery Channel	Individual episode
Cursed	2005	Discovery Channel	Individual episode
The Haunting of Summerwind	2005	Discovery Channel	Individual episode
Echoes From The Grave	2005	Discovery Channel	Individual episode
Darkness Follows	2005	Discovery Channel	Individual episode
Seasons 1 and 2	September 4, 2007	Timeless Media Group	
Seasons 1 and 2	November 2007	Discovery Channel	
Ghosts And Demons	February 5, 2008	Timeless Media Group	
The House	February 5, 2008	Timeless Media Group	Released in tin case on September 22, 2009
Meeting The Dead	February 5, 2008	Timeless Media Group	
Season 3	May 20, 2008	Timeless Media Group	
Season 4	September 9, 2008	Timeless Media Group	
Seasons 1–4	September 9, 2008	Timeless Media Group	
A Haunting in Connecticut	September 30, 2008	Echo Bridge Entertainment	
A Haunting in Georgia	September 30, 2008	Echo Bridge Entertainment	
Demon Angels	February 10, 2009	Timeless Media Group	Released in tin case on September 22, 2009
House of Fear	February 10, 2009	Timeless Media Group	Released in tin case on September 22, 2009
Spirits From The Past	May 12, 2009	Timeless Media Group	Released in tin case on September 22, 2009
The Anguished	May 12, 2009	Timeless Media Group	
Twilight of Evil	May 12, 2009	Timeless Media Group	Released on Blu-ray on July 14, 2009; released in tin case on September 22, 2009
Season 5	April 23, 2013	Shout! Factory/Timeless Media Group	
Season 6	August 19, 2014	Shout! Factory/Timeless Media Group	
Seasons 1-6	October 14, 2014	Shout! Factory/Timeless Media Group	
Season 7	April 14, 2015	Shout! Factory/Timeless Media Group	

== Films ==
Gold Circle Films created two feature-length movies based on cases featured in A Haunting: The Haunting in Connecticut which was released in 2009, and The Haunting in Connecticut 2: Ghosts of Georgia, released in 2013.

== Accolades ==
Award	Year (Note: Indicates the year of ceremony. Each year is linked to the article about the awards held that year, wherever possible.)	Category	Nominee(s) / Work	Result	Ref(s)
The Telly Awards	2008	Bronze Telly: Film/Video – TV Programs, Segments, or Promotional Pieces – Documentary	A Haunting; New Dominion Pictures, LLC; Discovery Channel (for "The Unleashed")	Won	
The Telly Awards	2013	Silver Telly: Film/Video – TV Programs, Segments, or Promotional Pieces – Documentary	A Haunting; New Dominion Pictures, LLC (for "The Exorcism of Cindy Sauer")	Won	
The Telly Awards	2015	Bronze Telly: Film/Video – TV Programs, Segments, or Promotional Pieces – Documentary	A Haunting; New Dominion Pictures, LLC (for "Curse of the Mummy")	Won	
The Telly Awards	2020	People's Bronze Telly: TV Programs/Segments – Television	A Haunting; New Dominion Pictures, LLC	Won	
The Telly Awards	2020	Silver Telly: Documentary: Series – Television	A Haunting; New Dominion Pictures, LLC	Won	
The Telly Awards	2020	Silver Telly: Use of Music – Television	A Haunting; New Dominion Pictures, LLC; Ed Smart (Composer) (for "Provoking Evil")	Won	
The Telly Awards	2023	People's Silver Telly: Television Series/Shows/Segments – People's Telly	A Haunting Season 11; New Dominion Pictures, LLC; Nicolas Valcour; Laura Marini; Lance Catania; Kelly Tucker; Dawn Wilfong; Kay Rothman	Won	
The Telly Awards	2023	Silver Telly: Horror – Television	A Haunting; New Dominion Pictures, LLC; Nicolas Valcour; Laura Marini; Dawn Wilfong; Lance Catania (for "Asylum 49")	Won	

== See also ==
- Paranormal television
