= Wang Manao =

Coordinates: 13.340147°N 99.831259°E

Wang Manao (Thai: วังมะนาว, pronounced [wāŋ mā.nāːw]) is a tambon (sub-district) of Pak Tho District in Ratchaburi Province, western Thailand.

== History ==
The condition of the area of Wang Manao is always flooded, causing it to certain areas form a deep waterbody. In addition, there are many wild type lime trees. Hence the name "Wang Manao", which means "deep waterbody of limes".

Wang Manao is the passageway of the flash flood that flows from the west side. So people set up their houses on the low hills, consisted of people of various races such as Thai Chinese, Tai Dam, Khmer etc. Most of the locals are engaged in rice farming and animal husbandry.

On March 30, 1996, it was upgraded from the Wang Manao Sub-District Council to the "Wang Manao Subdistrict Administrative Organization".

== Geography ==
Wang Manao is in the south of Pak Tho District. The distance is about 3 km (1.9 mi) from downtown Pak Tho. Most of the area is lowland, sloping from west to east, with a total area of 27 km^{2} or approximately 16,875 rais.

The sub-district is bounded by the other sub-districts (from the north clockwise): Don Sai and Pak Tho in its district, Wan Dao in its district, Nong Chumphon Nuea and Huai Rong in Khao Yoi District of Phetchaburi Province, and Huai Yang Thon in its district respectively.

== Administration ==
The entire area is governed by Wang Manao Subdistrict Administrative Organization (องค์การบริหารส่วนตำบลวังมะนาว).

It was further divided into seven administrative mubans (village).

== Transportation ==
In terms of transportation Wang Manao is regarded as "Gateway to the South", due to it is the location of the Wang Manao Interchange, the meeting point of Phet Kasem and Rama II Roads, two main highways leading to the south from Bangkok, where Rama II Road terminates at km 84, while Phet Kasem Road continues to next district, namely Khao Yoi in province of Phetchaburi.

This junction can be considered very busy, especially during festivals such as Songkran or New Year. Wang Manao is a rest stop, there are gas stations and many restaurants along two sides of Phet Kasem Road including PTT gas station that claims to be the largest and most modern in the world.
