= Bo Takhro railway station =

Railway station in Bo Kradan, Thailand

Coordinates: 13.4412°N 99.8352°E

Bo Takhro บ่อตะคร้อ
- Station in 2025

General information
- Location: Ratchaburi Local Road No. 2026, Mu 3 (Ban Bo Takhro), Bo Kradan Subdistrict, Pak Tho District, Ratchaburi
- Owner: State Railway of Thailand
- Line: Southern Line
- Platforms: 3
- Tracks: 3

Other information
- Station code: บร.

Services
Preceding station	State Railway of Thailand	Following station
Ban Khu Bua towards Hua Lamphong or Krung Thep Aphiwat	Southern Line	Ban Pa Kai Halt towards Su-ngai Kolok
Location

Bo Takhro station (Thai: สถานีบ่อตะคร้อ) is a railway station located in Bo Kradan Subdistrict, Pak Tho District, Ratchaburi. It is a class 3 railway station located 111.207 km (69.1 mi) from Thon Buri railway station.

In 2024, the station was rebuilt as part of the double-track section from Nakhon Pathom - Chumphon. The new station featured elevated platforms and a new station building.

== Services ==
- Ordinary 251/252 Thon Buri - Prachuap Khiri Khan - Thon Buri
- Ordinary 254 Lang Suan - Thon Buri

== Gallery ==
Former station building in 2021
