= Dan Makham Tia district =

Dan Makham Tia ด่านมะขามเตี้ย
- District
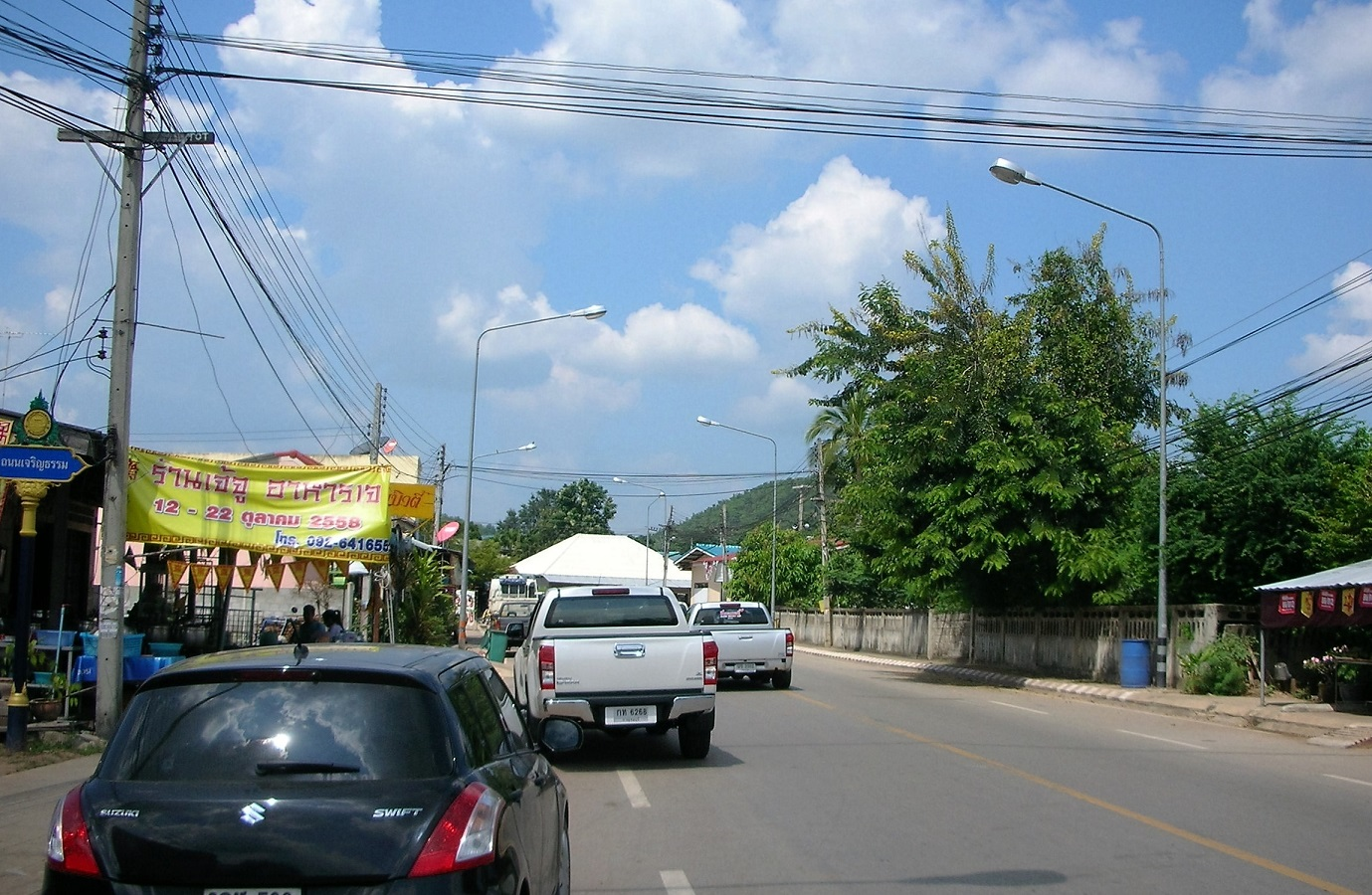
- Dan Makham Tia main street

- District location in Kanchanaburi province
- Coordinates: 13°51′13″N 99°24′38″E
- Country: Thailand
- Province: Kanchanaburi
- Seat: Dan Makham Tia

Area
  - Total: 807 km^{2} (312 sq mi)

Population (2024)
  - Total: 33,736
  - Density: 42/km^{2} (110/sq mi)
- Time zone: UTC+7 (ICT)
- Postal code: 71260
- Calling code: 034
- ISO 3166 code: TH-7111

Dan Makham Tia (ด่านมะขามเตี้ย, pronounced [dàːn mā.kʰǎːm tîa]) is a district (amphoe) in the southern part of Kanchanaburi province, western Thailand.

== History ==
The area of Dan Makham Tia was settled more than 200 years. It was a border village of Mueang Kanchanaburi adjacent to Burma.

The area had a short Makham tree (Tamarindus indica), so people called the village Ban Nong Makham Tia. Later was changed to be Dan Makham Tia.

The minor district (king amphoe) was created on 1 April 1990 by splitting off the three tambons Dan Makham Tia, Klondo, and Chorakhe Phueak from Mueang Kanchanaburi district. It was upgraded to a full district on 8 September 1995.

== Geography ==
Neighboring districts are (from the north clockwise) Mueang Kanchanaburi, Tha Muang of Kanchanaburi Province, Chom Bueng and Suan Phueng of Ratchaburi province.

The most important water resources in the area are the Khwae Noi and Phachi River.

== Administration ==
=== Provincial administration ===
The district is divided into four subdistricts (tambons), which are further subdivided into 41 administrative villages (mubans).

No.	Subdistrict	Thai	Villages	Pop.
1.	Dan Makham Tia	ด่านมะขามเตี้ย	12	10,426
2.	Klondo	กลอนโด	11	8,095
3.	Chorakhe Phueak	จรเข้เผือก	12	11,192
4.	Nong Phai	หนองไผ่	6	4,023
		Total	41	33,736

=== Local government ===
==== Municipality ====
As of December 2024 there is one municipal (thesaban) area in the district: Dan Makham Tia subdistrict municipality (thesaban tambon) covers parts of the same-named subdistrict.

Subdistrict municipality	Pop.	LAO code	website
Dan Makham Tia	2,433	05711101	danmakhamtia.go.th

==== Subdistrict administrative organizations ====
The non-municipal areas are administered by four subdistrict administrative organizations - SAO (ongkan borihan suan tambon - o bo toh).

Subdistrict adm.org - SAO	Pop.	LAO code	website
Chorakhe Phueak SAO	11,192	06711103	chorakhephuak.go.th/site/
Klondo SAO	8,095	06711102	klondo-sao.go.th
Dan Makham Tia SAO	7,993	06711104	danmakhamtia-sao.go.th
Nong Phai SAO	4,023	06711105	nongphai-kan.go.th

== Education ==
- 26 primary schools
- 1 secondary school

== Healthcare ==
=== Hospitals ===
Dan Makham Tia district is served by one hospital

- Dan Makham Tia Hospital with 56 beds.

=== Health promoting hospitals ===
In the district there are six health-promoting hospitals in total.

1 Nong Phai	2 Klondo	3 Chorakhe Phueak

== Religion ==
There are thirty-two Theravada Buddhist temples in the district.

3 Nong Phai	7 Klondo	10 Chorakhe Phueak	11 Dan Makham Tia
