= Ban Pa Kai railway halt =

Railway stop in Pa Kai, Thailand

Coordinates: 13°24′42.2″N 99°50′19.3″E

Ban Pa Kai บ้านป่าไก่
- Railway halt in 2025

General information
- Location: Pa Kai Subdistrict, Pak Tho District, Ratchaburi
- Owner: State Railway of Thailand
- Line: Southern Line
- Platforms: 1
- Tracks: 2

Other information
- Station code: ไป.

Services
Preceding station	State Railway of Thailand	Following station
Bo Takhro towards Hua Lamphong or Krung Thep Aphiwat	Southern Line	Pak Tho towards Su-ngai Kolok
Location

Ban Pa Kai Halt (Thai: ที่หยุดรถบ้านป่าไก่) is a railway halt located in Pa Kai Subdistrict, Pak Tho District, Ratchaburi. It is located 114.5 km (71.1 mi) from Thon Buri Railway Station.

== Services ==
- Ordinary 251/252 Thon Buri - Prachuap Khiri Khan - Thon Buri
