= Ban Khu Bua railway station =

Railway station in Thailand

Coordinates: 13.4927°N 99.8284°E

Ban Khu Bua บ้านคูบัว
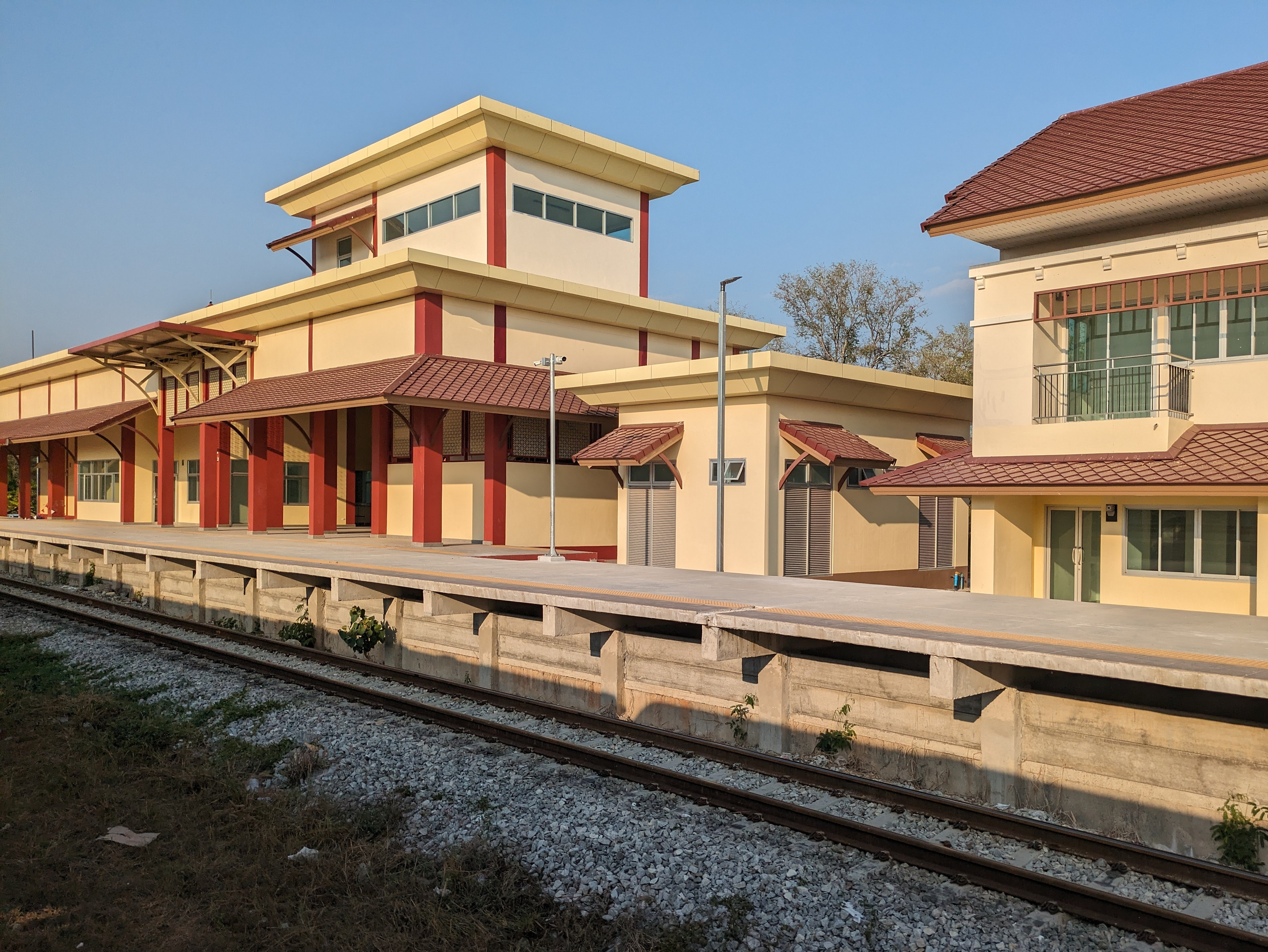

General information
- Location: Ban Klang-Ban Pufa Road, Mu 3 (Ban Khu Bua), Khu Bua Subdistrict, Ratchaburi City
- Owner: State Railway of Thailand
- Line: Southern Line
- Platforms: 2
- Tracks: 2

Other information
- Station code: บบ.

Services
Preceding station	State Railway of Thailand	Following station
Ratchaburi towards Hua Lamphong or Krung Thep Aphiwat	Southern Line	Bo Takhro towards Su-ngai Kolok
Location

Ban Khu Bua station (Thai: สถานีบ้านคูบัว) is a railway station located in Khu Bua Subdistrict, Ratchaburi City, Ratchaburi. It is a class 3 railway station located 105.462 km (65.5 mi) from Thon Buri railway station.

In 2019, the old station was demolished to make way for the double-track section from Nakhon Pathom to Chumphon. A new station building and elevated platforms were later built near the original site.

== Gallery ==
Temporary station office used during the construction, opposite of the current station.

== Services ==
- Ordinary 251/252 Thon Buri -Prachuap Khiri Khan - Thon Buri
- Ordinary 254 Lang Suan - Thon Buri
