= Nong Ya Plong district =

Nong Ya Plong หนองหญ้าปล้อง
- District
- District location in Phetchaburi province
- Coordinates: 13°9′47″N 99°41′50″E
- Country: Thailand
- Province: Phetchaburi
- Seat: Nong Ya Plong

Area
  - Total: 1,249.8 km^{2} (482.6 sq mi)

Population (2005)
  - Total: 14,390
  - Density: 11.5/km^{2} (30/sq mi)
- Time zone: UTC+7 (ICT)
- Postal code: 76160
- Geocode: 7603

Nong Ya Plong (Thai: หนองหญ้าปล้อง, pronounced [nɔ̌ːŋ jâː plɔ̂ŋ]) is a district (amphoe) in the northwestern part of Phetchaburi province, western Thailand.

== History ==
Nong Ya Plong was established as a minor district (king amphoe) on 16 July 1972, when three tambons, Nong Ya Plong, Yang Nam Klat Nuea, and Yang Nam Klat Tai were split off from Khao Yoi district. It was upgraded to a full district on 21 May 1990.

== Geography ==
Neighboring districts are (from the north clockwise) Ban Kha and Pak Tho of Ratchaburi province, Khao Yoi, Ban Lat, and Kaeng Krachan of Phetchaburi Province. To the west is the Tanintharyi Division of Myanmar.

== Administration ==
The district is divided into four sub-districts (tambons), which are further subdivided into 31 villages (mubans). There are no municipal areas (thesaban), and three tambon administrative organizations (TAO).

No.	Name	Thai name	Villages	Pop.
1.	Nong Ya Plong	หนองหญ้าปล้อง	11	6,411
2.	Yang Nam Klat Nuea	ยางน้ำกลัดเหนือ	5	1,867
3.	Yang Nam Klat Tai	ยางน้ำกลัดใต้	7	2,375
4.	Tha Takhro	ท่าตะคร้อ	8	3,737
