= Ratchaburi railway station =

Railway station in Thailand

Ratchaburi ราชบุรี
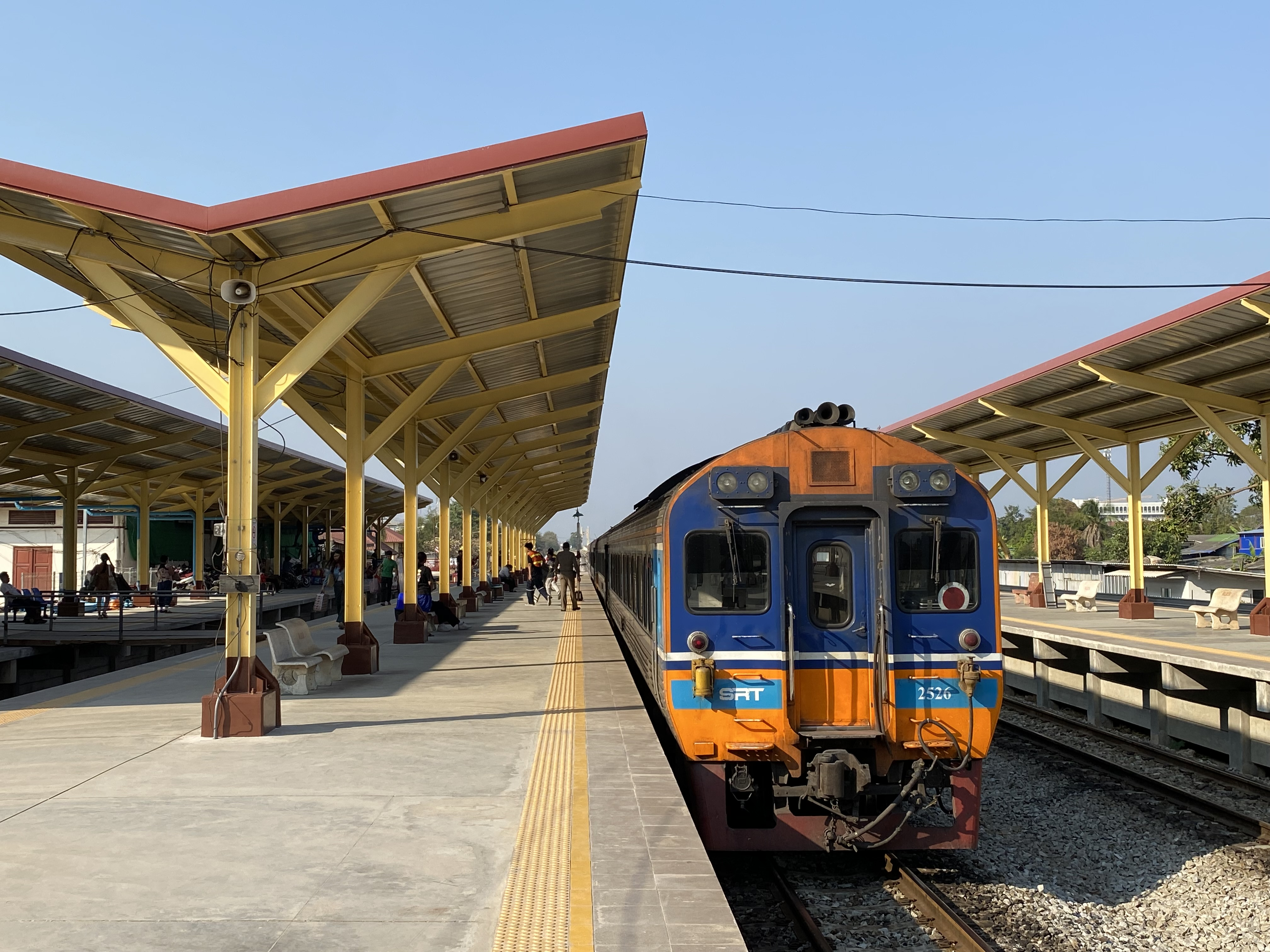
- Ratchaburi railway station in 2025

General information
- Location: Kathathon Road, Na Mueang Subdistrict, Mueang Ratchaburi District, Ratchaburi 70000
- Owner: State Railway of Thailand
- Line: Southern Line
- Platforms: 3
- Tracks: 4

Other information
- Station code: รร.

History
- Opened: 19 June 1903

Services
Preceding station	State Railway of Thailand	Following station
Saphan Chulalongkorn Halt towards Hua Lamphong or Krung Thep Aphiwat	Southern Line	Ban Khu Bua towards Su-ngai Kolok
Location

Ratchaburi railway station is a railway station in Na Mueang Subdistrict, Mueang Ratchaburi District, Ratchaburi Province, 101.315 km (63.0 mi) from Thon Buri railway station. It is a class 1 railway station and the main station of Ratchaburi Province.

== History ==
Ratchaburi station (formerly spelled Ratburi or Rajburi) opened on 19 June 1903 along with the opening of the first phase of the Southern Line from Bangkok Noi to Phetchaburi. The first station building was a 2-story wooden building built in 1900. It was later replaced with a concrete building during King Vajiravudh's era. The station was located 1 kilometer south of Mae Klong River. Therefore, a water tank, water cranes were present to refuel steam locomotives. A small turntable was also present as Ratchaburi was a terminus for some services. These remnants can be seen after the steam age up until the construction of the double-track.

Ratchaburi station was rebuilt during the construction of the double-track section from Nakhon Pathom to Chumphon. The station received a new building, elevated platforms and a footbridge.

== Gallery ==
Station in 2019

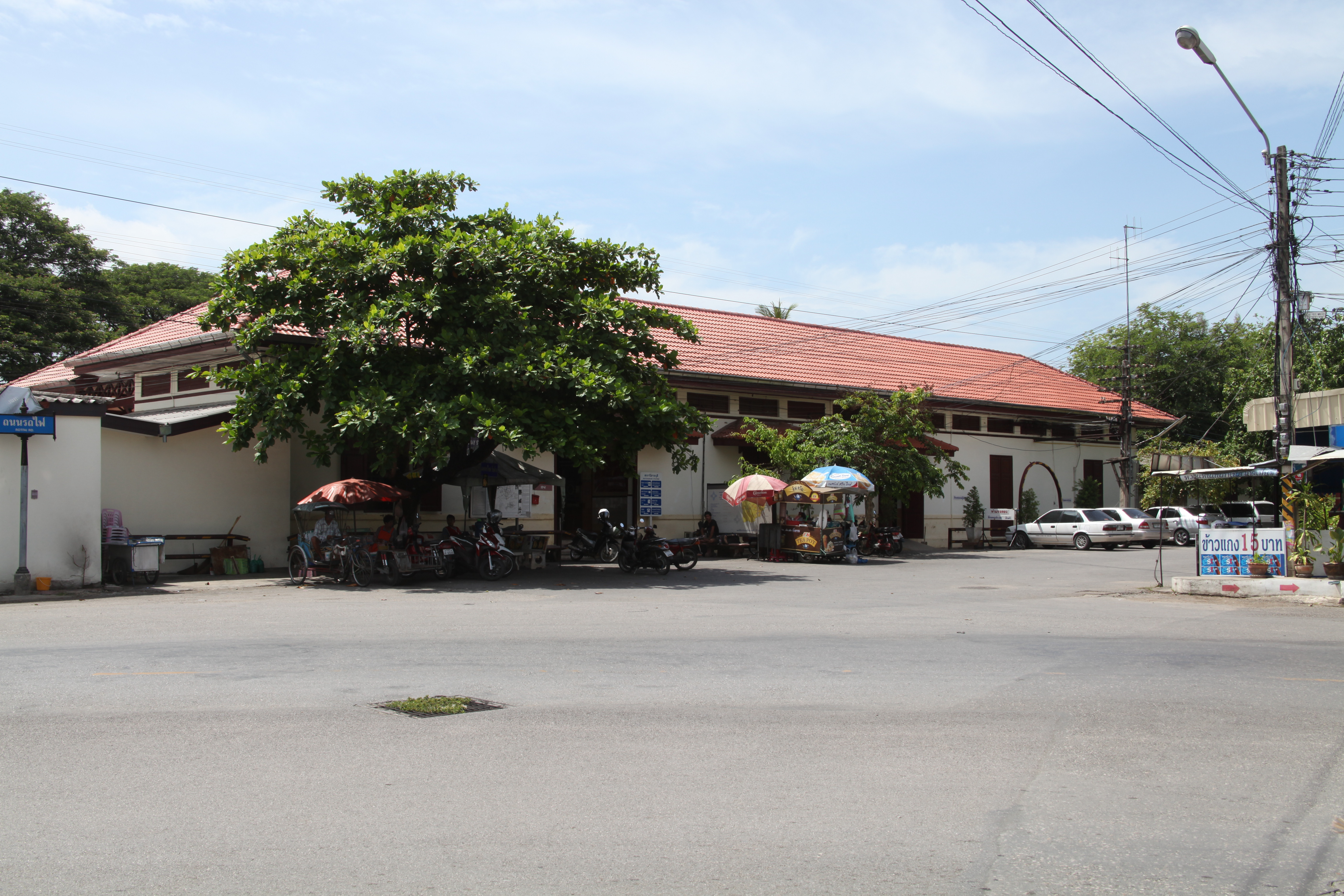
Old station, viewed from Kathathorn road.

Old station building in 2024. The platform roof were eventually removed to make way for elevated platforms.

The old signal room
