= Khao Yoi district =

Khao Yoi เขาย้อย
- District
- District location in Phetchaburi province
- Coordinates: 13°14′25″N 99°49′27″E
- Country: Thailand
- Province: Phetchaburi
- Seat: Khao Yoi

Area
  - Total: 305.648 km^{2} (118.011 sq mi)

Population (2008)
  - Total: 37,697
  - Density: 121.8/km^{2} (315/sq mi)
- Time zone: UTC+7 (ICT)
- Postal code: 76140
- Geocode: 7602

Khao Yoi (Thai: เขาย้อย, pronounced [kʰǎw jɔ́ːj]) is a district (amphoe) in the northern part of Phetchaburi province, western Thailand.

== History ==
The district was established in 1897 and Luang Phromsan (หลวงพรหมสาร) was assigned as the first district officer. At first named Huai Luang, the district was renamed Khao Yoi in 1903 due to the site of the district office. The name of the district comes from the limestone hill called Khao Yoi which is just off Phetkasem highway. The hill contains three caves, one of which has been converted to a cave temple with a notable reclining Buddha.

== Geography ==
Neighboring districts are (from the north clockwise) Pak Tho of Ratchaburi province, Amphawa of Samut Songkhram province, Ban Laem, Mueang Phetchaburi, Ban Lat, and Nong Ya Plong of Phetchaburi Province.

== Administration ==
The district is divided into 10 sub-districts (tambons), which are further subdivided into 59 villages (mubans). The sub-district municipality (thesaban tambon) Khao Yoi covers parts of tambons Khao Yoi, Sa Phang, Bang Khem, and Thap Khang. There are a further seven tambon administrative organizations (TAO) responsible for the non-municipal area.

No.	Name	Thai	Villages	Pop.
1.	Khao Yoi	เขาย้อย	7	6,873
2.	Sa Phang	สระพัง	4	3,296
3.	Bang Khem	บางเค็ม	6	3,834
4.	Thap Khang	ทับคาง	5	3,548
5.	Nong Pla Lai	หนองปลาไหล	5	2,692
6.	Nong Prong	หนองปรง	6	3,935
7.	Nong Chumphon	หนองชุมพล	7	4,605
8.	Huai Rong	ห้วยโรง	4	2,507
9.	Huai Tha Chang	ห้วยท่าช้าง	8	2,034
10.	Nong Chumphon Nuea	หนองชุมพลเหนือ	7	4,373
