= Phachi River =

River in Thailand

Coordinates: 14.0189°N 99.5265°E

The Phachi River (Thai: แม่น้ำภาชี, RTGS: Maenam Phachi, pronounced [mɛ̂ː.náːm pʰāː.t͡ɕʰīː]) is a river in western Thailand. It originates in the Tenasserim Hills in Ban Kha District and passes Suan Phueng and Chom Bueng districts, Ratchaburi Province. The river tributes to the Khwae Noi River in Mueang Kanchanaburi district, Kanchanaburi Province.
