= Ban Kha district =

Ban Kha บ้านคา
- District
- District location in Ratchaburi province
- Coordinates: 13°25′48″N 99°24′30″E
- Country: Thailand
- Province: Ratchaburi
- Seat: Ban Kha

Area
  - Total: 1,026.9 km^{2} (396.5 sq mi)

Population (2017)
  - Total: 25,147
  - Density: 24.48/km^{2} (63.4/sq mi)
- Time zone: UTC+7 (ICT)
- Postal code: 70180
- Geocode: 7010

Ban Kha (Thai: บ้านคา, pronounced [bâːn kʰāː]) is a district (amphoe) in the western part of Ratchaburi province, western Thailand.

== History ==
Due to the large area of Suan Phueng district the government split the southern part of Suan Phueng to create a minor district (king amphoe) becoming effective 1 July 1997. The present district office was opened on 29 March 1999.

On 15 May 2007, all 81 minor districts were upgraded to full districts. On 24 August the upgrade became official.

== Geography ==
Neighboring districts are (from the north clockwise) Suan Phueng, Chom Bueng and Pak Tho of Ratchaburi Province, and Nong Ya Plong of Phetchaburi province. To the west is Tanintharyi Division of Myanmar.

The important water resource is the Phachi River. On the left shore of the river the Chaloem Phra Kiat Thai Prachan National Park is in process of being established, extending into the neighboring Pak Tho District.

== Administration ==
The district is divided into three sub-districts (tambons), which are further subdivided into 35 villages (mubans). There are no municipal (thesaban) areas in the district. There are three tambon administrative organizations (TAO).

No.	Name	Thai name	Villages	Pop.
1.	Ban Kha	บ้านคา	13	9,160
2.	Ban Bueng	บ้านบึง	13	9,495
3.	Nong Phan Chan	หนองพันจันทร์	11	6,492
