= Wat Phleng district =

Wat Phleng วัดเพลง
- District
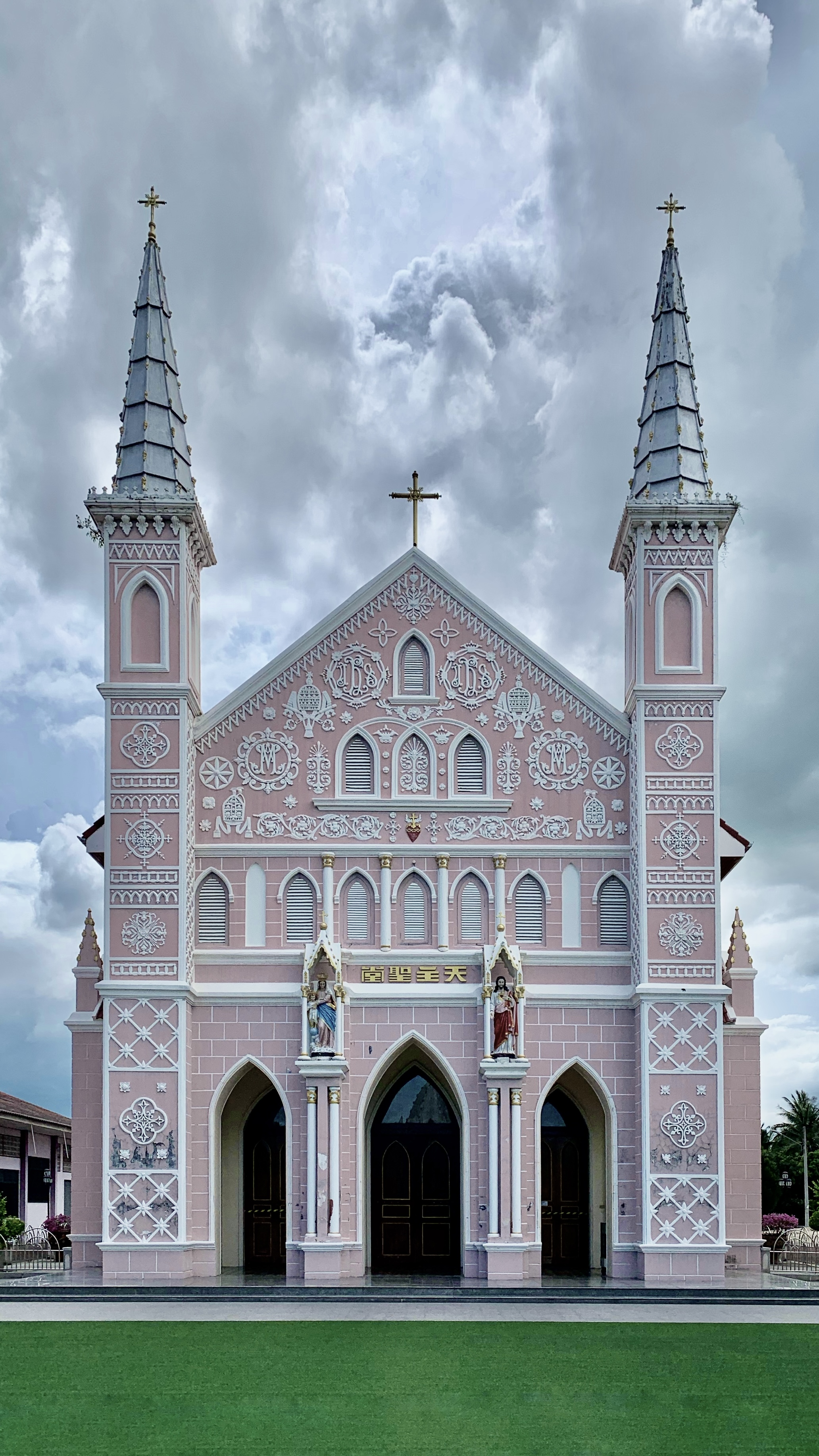
- Sacred Heart Church

- District location in Ratchaburi province
- Coordinates: 13°27′14″N 99°53′13″E
- Country: Thailand
- Province: Ratchaburi
- Seat: Wat Phleng
- Tambon: 3
- Muban: 28

Area
  - Total: 37.892 km^{2} (14.630 sq mi)

Population (2017)
  - Total: 12,178
  - Density: 321.38/km^{2} (832.4/sq mi)
- Time zone: UTC+7 (ICT)
- Postal code: 70170
- Geocode: 7009

Wat Phleng (Thai: วัดเพลง, pronounced [wát pʰlēːŋ]) is a district (amphoe) of Ratchaburi province, western Thailand.

== History ==
In the past, the district was called Wat Pradu District because the office was in front of Wat Pradu, Wat Pradu canal. When the district office was moved to the present area, the district name was changed to be Maenam Om district. Later in 1914 the government moved the district office of Maenam Om to Tambon Pak Tho, which was more accessible as it was near the railway station. The old central area was made the Wat Phleng minor district (king amphoe). It was upgraded to a full district again on 17 July 1963.

== Geography ==
Neighboring districts are (from the southwest clockwise) Pak Tho and Mueang Ratchaburi of Ratchaburi Province and Bang Khonthi and Amphawa of Samut Songkhram province.

The important water resource is the Khwae Om River, a branch of the Mae Klong River.

== Administration ==
=== Central administration ===
Wat Phleng is divided into three subdistricts (tambons), which are further subdivided into 28 administrative villages (mubans).

No.	Name	Thai	Villages	Pop.
1.	Ko San Phra	เกาะศาลพระ	10	3,698
2.	Chom Prathat	จอมประทัด	8	3,537
3.	Wat Phleng	วัดเพลง	10	4,943

=== Local administration ===
There is one subdistrict municipality (thesaban tambon) in the district:

- Wat Phleng (Thai: เทศบาลตำบลวัดเพลง) consisting of parts of subdistricts Ko San Phra and Wat Phleng.

There are three subdistrict administrative organizations (SAO) in the district:

- Ko San Phra (Thai: องค์การบริหารส่วนตำบลเกาะศาลพระ) consisting of parts of subdistrict Ko San Phra.
- Chom Prathat (Thai: องค์การบริหารส่วนตำบลจอมประทัด) consisting of subdistrict Chom Prathat.
- Wat Phleng (Thai: องค์การบริหารส่วนตำบลวัดเพลง) consisting of parts of subdistrict Wat Phleng.
