= Suan Phueng district =

Suan Phueng สวนผึ้ง
- District
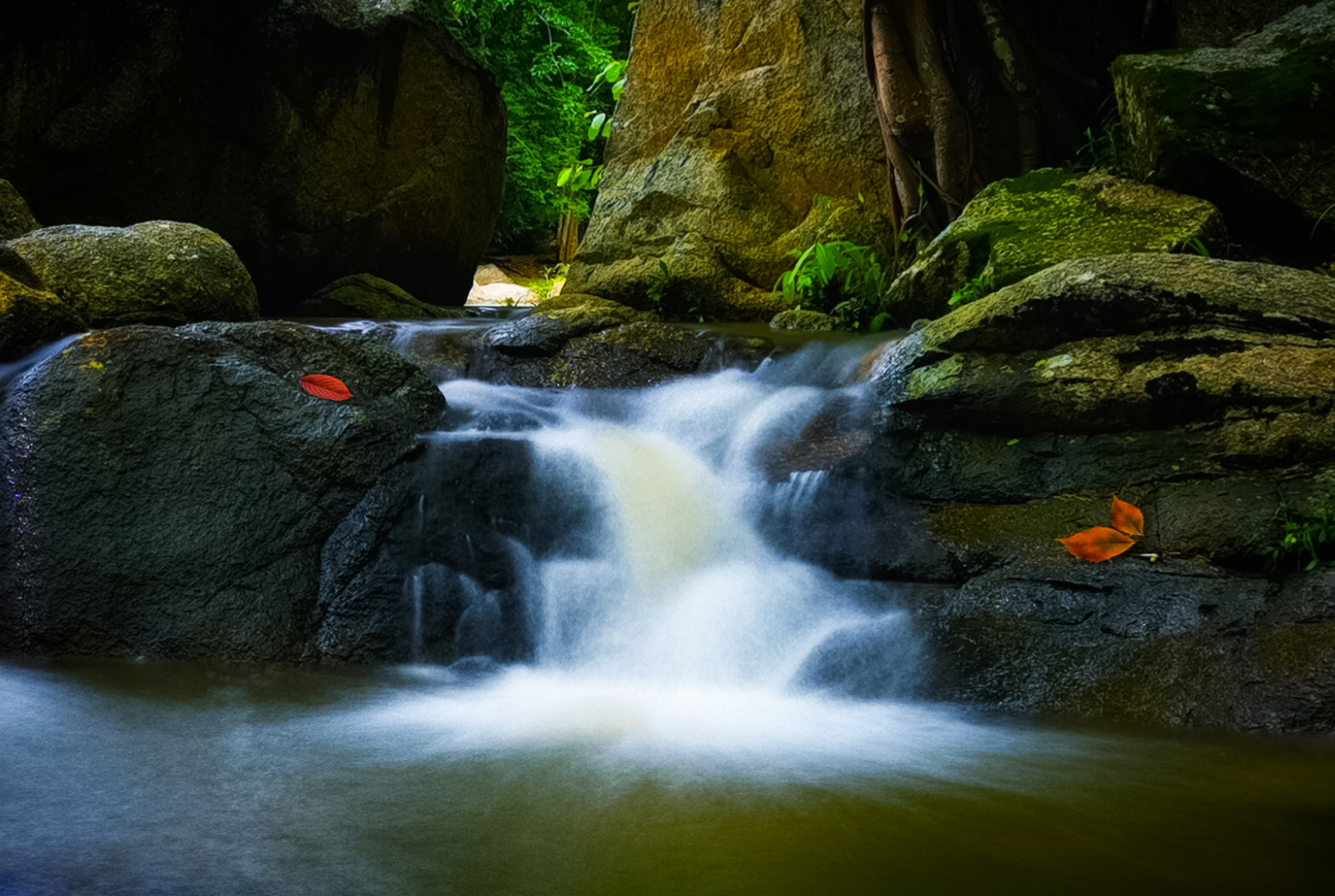
- Kaeng Som Maew, a large stone islet in the Phachi River

- District location in Ratchaburi province
- Coordinates: 13°32′36″N 99°20′24″E
- Country: Thailand
- Province: Ratchaburi
- Seat: Suan Phueng

Area
  - Total: 1,005.08 km^{2} (388.06 sq mi)

Population (2017)
  - Total: 52,637
  - Density: 52.37/km^{2} (135.6/sq mi)
- Time zone: UTC+7 (ICT)
- Postal code: 70180
- Geocode: 7003

Suan Phueng (Thai: สวนผึ้ง, pronounced [sǔa̯n pʰɯ̂ŋ]) is a district (amphoe) in the western part of Ratchaburi province, western Thailand.

== History ==
Suan Phueng was the rural area of Chom Bueng district. It became a minor district (king amphoe) on 15 November 1974, consisting of the three tambons: Suan Phueng, Pa Waim, and Ban Bueng. It was upgraded to a full district on 1 April 1983.

== Etymology ==
The name Suan Phueng (lit. 'bee garden') originates from Ficus albipila trees dotting the district. Bees often build hives in these trees.

== Geography ==
Neighboring districts are (from the north clockwise): Dan Makham Tia of Kanchanaburi province; and Chom Bueng and Ban Kha of Ratchaburi Province. To the west is the Tanintharyi Division of Myanmar.

An important water resource is the Phachi River.

== Administration ==
The district is divided into four sub-districts (tambons), which are further subdivided into 37 villages (mubans). There are two sub-district municipalities (thesaban tambons) within the district. Suan Phueng covers parts of tambon Suan Phueng, and Ban Chat Pa Wai covers parts of tambons Pa Wai and Tha Khoei.

1.	Suan Phueng	สวนผึ้ง
2.	Pa Wai	ป่าหวาย
4.	Tha Khoei	ท่าเคย
7.	Thanao Si	ตะนาวศรี

The missing numbers are the tambon which now form Ban Kha minor district.
