= Chom Bueng district =

Chom Bueng จอมบึง
- District
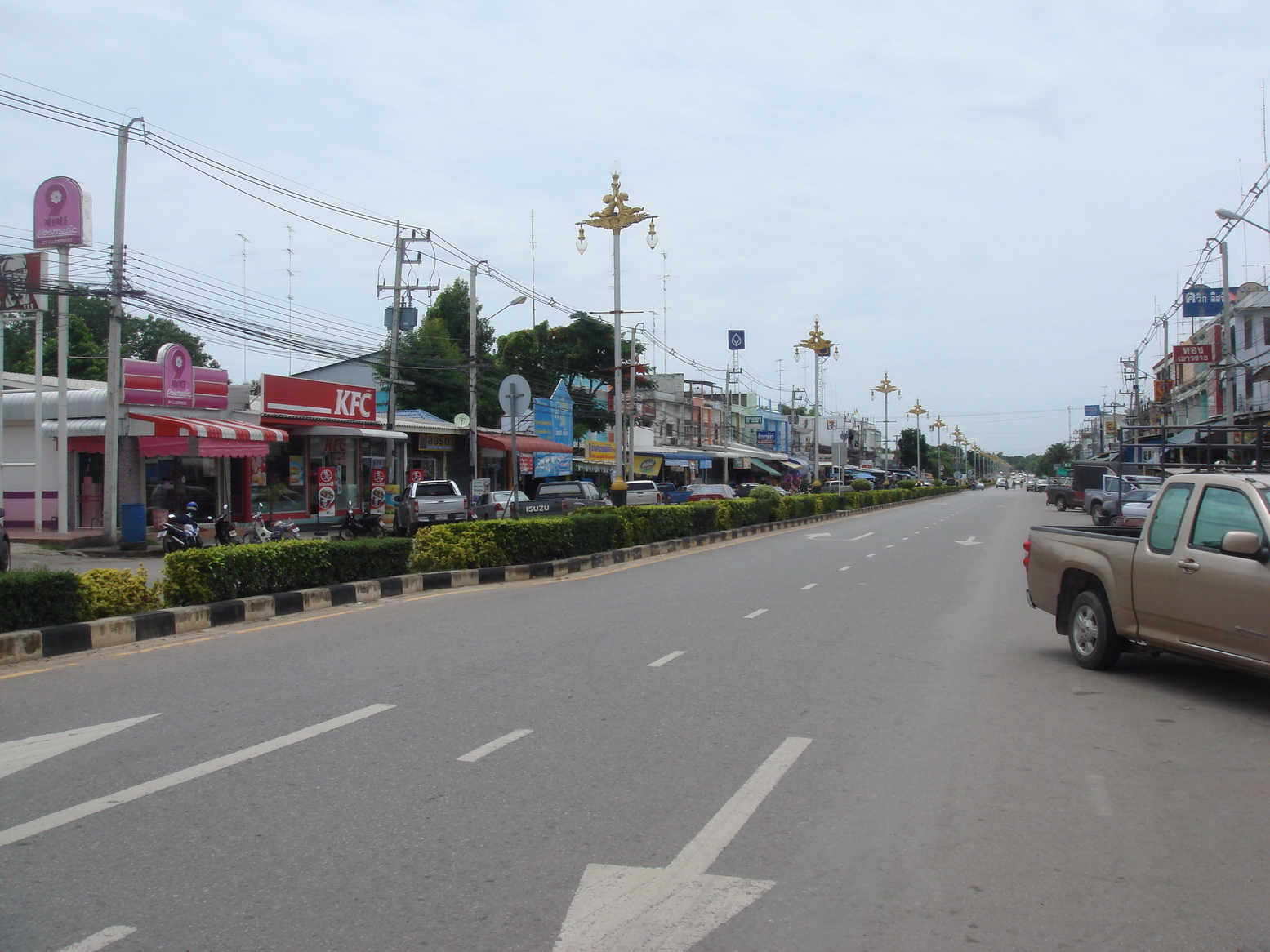
- Chom Bueng city center

- District location in Ratchaburi province
- Coordinates: 13°37′11″N 99°35′30″E
- Country: Thailand
- Province: Ratchaburi
- Tambon: 6
- Muban: 90

Area
  - Total: 772.1 km^{2} (298.1 sq mi)

Population (2017)
  - Total: 63,702
  - Density: 82.5/km^{2} (214/sq mi)
- Time zone: UTC+7 (ICT)
- Postal code: 70150
- Geocode: 7002

Chom Bueng (Thai: จอมบึง, pronounced [t͡ɕɔ̄ːm bɯ̄ŋ]) is a district (amphoe) of Ratchaburi province in western Thailand.

== Geography ==
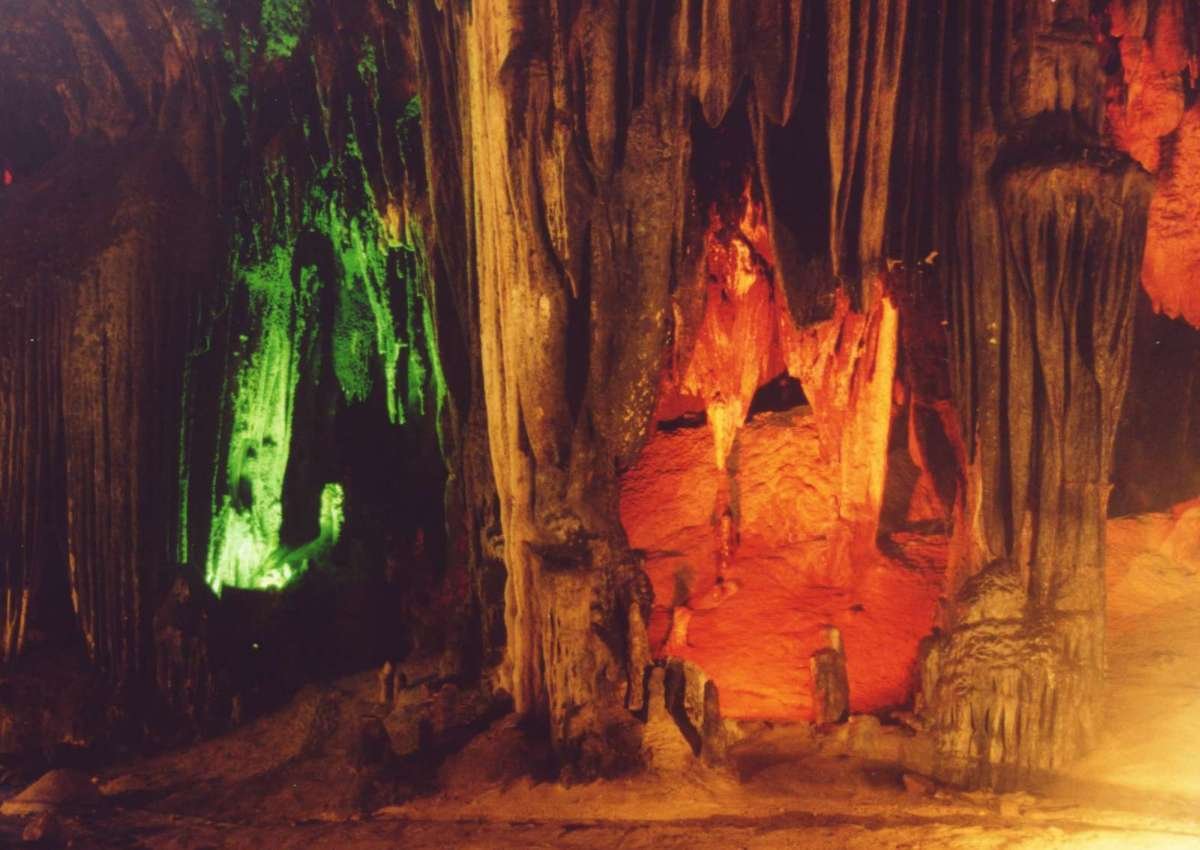
Khao Bin cave

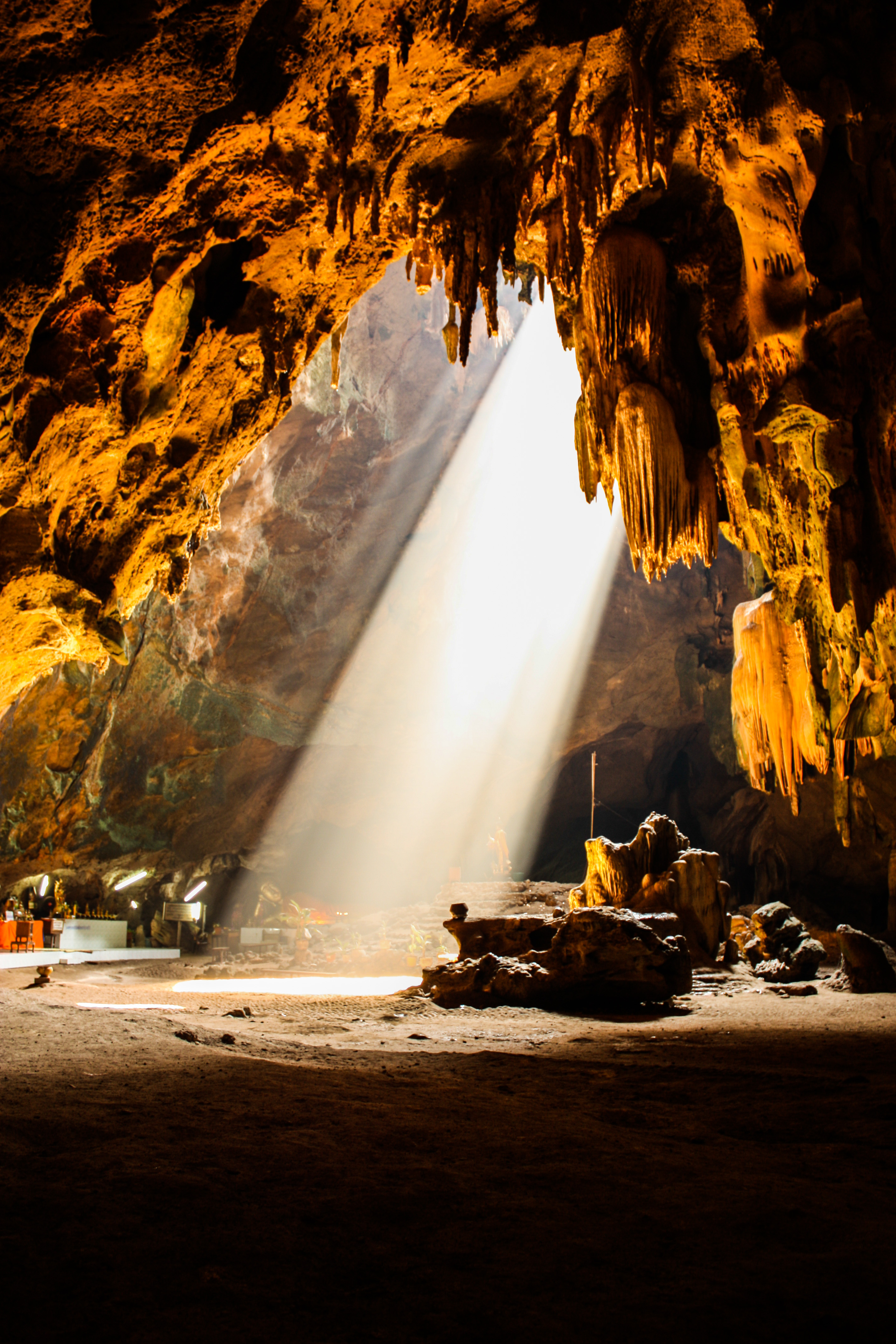
Chomphon cave

Neighboring districts are (from the north clockwise): Dan Makham Tia and Tha Muang of Kanchanaburi province; and Photharam, Mueang Ratchaburi, Pak Tho, Ban Kha, and Suan Phueng of Ratchaburi Province.

Several caves are found in the district. Khao Bin cave is regarded as the most beautiful, having many stalactites and stalagmites and a "holy" pond. The cave is named after a rock formation which looks like a flying bird. Chomphon cave was renamed by King Chulalongkorn during his visit in the area in 1895, due to a stalactite that resembled an epaulette of a field marshal.

== History ==
In 1895 King Chulalongkorn and Queen Saovabha visited Ratchaburi province, including the district. The king saw a large lake there. He then renamed the area big lake or chom bueng, and made it a minor district (king amphoe).

In 1958 Chom Bueng was upgraded to Chom Bueng District.

== Administration ==
=== Central administration ===
Chom Bueng is divided into six sub-districts (tambons), which are further subdivided into 90 administrative villages (mubans).

No.	Name	Thai	Villages	Pop.
1.	Chom Bueng	จอมบึง	13	15,441
2.	Pak Chong	ปากช่อง	16	9,706
3.	Boek Phrai	เบิกไพร	11	6,062
4.	Dan Thap Tako	ด่านทับตะโก	20	13,540
5.	Kaem On	แก้มอ้น	15	9,720
6.	Rang Bua	รางบัว	15	9,233

=== Local administration ===
There are two sub-district municipalities (thesaban tambons) in the district:

- Chom Bueng (Thai: เทศบาลตำบลจอมบึง) consisting of parts of sub-district Chom Bueng.
- Dan Thap Tako (Thai: เทศบาลตำบลด่านทับตะโก) consisting of parts of sub-district Dan Thap Tako.

There are six sub-district administrative organizations (SAO) in the district:

- Chom Bueng (Thai: องค์การบริหารส่วนตำบลจอมบึง) consisting of parts of sub-district Chom Bueng.
- Pak Chong (Thai: องค์การบริหารส่วนตำบลปากช่อง) consisting of sub-district Pak Chong.
- Boek Phrai (Thai: องค์การบริหารส่วนตำบลเบิกไพร) consisting of sub-district Boek Phrai.
- Dan Thap Tako (Thai: องค์การบริหารส่วนตำบลด่านทับตะโก) consisting of parts of sub-district Dan Thap Tako.
- Kaem On (Thai: องค์การบริหารส่วนตำบลแก้มอ้น) consisting of sub-district Kaem On.
- Rang Bua (Thai: องค์การบริหารส่วนตำบลรางบัว) consisting of sub-district Rang Bua.
