= Pak Tho district =

Pak Tho ปากท่อ
- District
- District location in Ratchaburi province
- Coordinates: 13°22′4″N 99°49′50″E
- Country: Thailand
- Province: Ratchaburi

Area
  - Total: 757.835 km^{2} (292.602 sq mi)

Population (2017)
  - Total: 67,525
  - Density: 89.1/km^{2} (231/sq mi)
- Time zone: UTC+7 (ICT)
- Postal code: 70140
- Geocode: 7008

Pak Tho (Thai: ปากท่อ, pronounced [pàːk tʰɔ̂ː]) is a district (amphoe) in the southern part of Ratchaburi province, western Thailand.

Pak Tho means 'mouth of a water pipe'. It originates from the fact that the area named Nong Thale ('sea pond') is rather low and thus during raining season was usually flooded. At the only outlet of this area the water current was strong like a water pipe.

== History ==
Around 1900, the government separated part of Mueang Ratchaburi district and created a new district named Tha Nat Wat Pradu (ท่านัดวัดประดู่). The district office was in front of Wat Pradu at the Khlong Wat Pradu in tambon Chom Prathat, today in Wat Phleng District. Tambon Pak Tho was included in this district. As it was also near the Om River, the district was also known as Maenam Om (แม่น้ำอ้อม). Later the district office was found to be inconveniently located. During the dry season the water level in the canal was too low and there was no road connection. In 1914 it was moved to a new location in tambon Pak Tho, near a railway station. The area around the old district office became the minor district Wat Phleng.

On 10 April 1991, the district was visited by Crown Prince Maha Vajiralongkorn. He was presented a petition by locals asking for help with local water resources, specifically the lack of water for farming. The crown prince passed along the need to the Royal Irrigation Department (RID) and other agencies. As of 2018 the district has five working reservoirs, a sixth in the planning stage, and Vajiralongkorn has ascended to the throne of Thailand.

== Geography ==
Neighboring districts are (from the west clockwise) Ban Kha, Chom Bueng, Mueang Ratchaburi, and Wat Phleng of Ratchaburi Province; Amphawa of Samut Songkhram province; and Khao Yoi and Nong Ya Plong of Phetchaburi province.

== Administration ==
The district is divided into 12 sub-districts (tambons), which are further subdivided into 88 villages (mubans). Pak Tho is a sub-district municipality (thesaban tambon) which covers parts of tambon Pak Tho. There are a further 11 tambon administrative organizations (TAO).

| No. | Name | Thai | Villages | Pop. |
|---|---|---|---|---|
| 1. | Thung Luang | ทุ่งหลวง | 16 | 13,542 |
| 2. | Wang Manao | วังมะนาว | 7 | 5,007 |
| 3. | Don Sai | ดอนทราย | 9 | 9,633 |
| 4. | Nong Krathum | หนองกระทุ่ม | 8 | 5,870 |
| 5. | Pak Tho | ปากท่อ | 8 | 7,468 |
| 6. | Pa Kai | ป่าไก่ | 5 | 3,180 |
| 7. | Wat Yang Ngam | วัดยางงาม | 5 | 2,375 |
| 8. | Ang Hin | อ่างหิน | 6 | 4,879 |
| 9. | Bo Kradan | บ่อกระดาน | 4 | 2,680 |
| 10. | Yang Hak | ยางหัก | 8 | 7,785 |
| 11. | Wan Dao | วันดาว | 7 | 880 |
| 12. | Huai Yang Thon | ห้วยยางโทน | 5 | 4,226 |

== Economy ==
The district is now farmed intensively year-round due to the water provided by the five reservoirs built since 1991. They are:

- Phu Krut: Built before 1995. Earthen reservoir with a capacity of 585,280 m^{3} supplying 1,600 rai of farmland and 320 homes.
- Huay Phu Krut: Built before 1995. Capacity, 270,750 m^{3}; supplies 130 households.
- Khao Hua Daeng: Built in 1997, its capacity is 612,000 m^{3} irrigating 1,000 rai, and supplying 308 households.
- Ban Thai Prachan: Built 1979. Capacity of 600,000 m^{3} watering 1,300 rai and supplying 150 households.
- Hin Si Ton Bon: Built 1979. Stores one million m^{3} supplying 1,700 rai and 200 households with water.
- Ban Prong Phrom: To be built in 2022, it will store up to 200,000 m^{3} of water.
