= Mueang Ratchaburi district =

Mueang Ratchaburi เมืองราชบุรี
- District
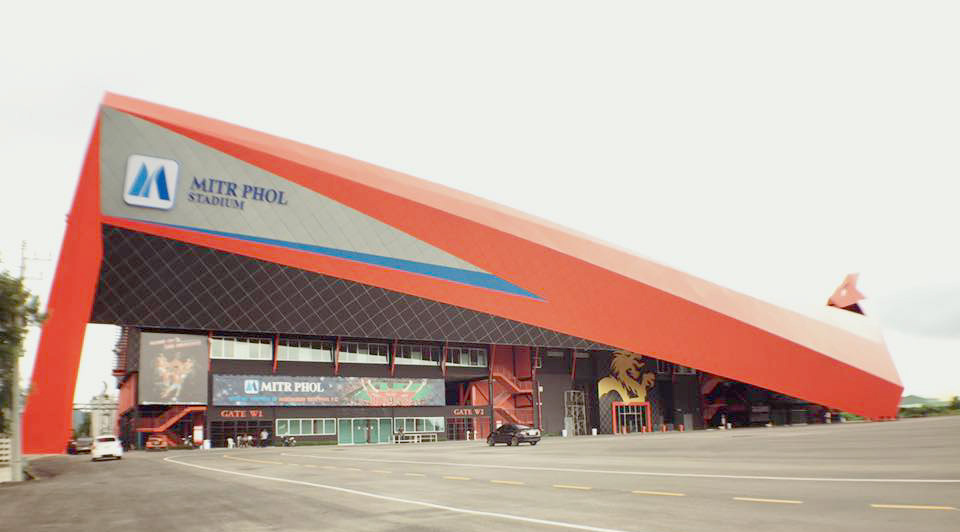
- Mitr Phol Stadium, home stadium of Ratchaburi F.C.

- District location in Ratchaburi province
- Coordinates: 13°31′42″N 99°48′42″E
- Country: Thailand
- Province: Ratchaburi
- Seat: Na Mueang

Area
  - Total: 1,200.5 km^{2} (463.5 sq mi)

Population (2024)
  - Total: 199,453
  - Density: 463.52/km^{2} (1,200.5/sq mi)
- Time zone: UTC+7 (ICT)
- Postal code: 70000
- Geocode: 7001

Mueang Ratchaburi (Thai: เมืองราชบุรี, pronounced [mɯ̄a̯ŋ râːt.t͡ɕʰā.bū.rīː]) is the capital district (amphoe mueang) of Ratchaburi province, western Thailand. As of 2017 the population of the district was 122,747.

== History ==
The history of the area can be dated back to the Dvaravati town, Khu Bua, just a few kilometres south of the modern town of Ratchaburi. After being deserted for about 300 years, the town was reestablished near Wat Mahathat by King U-Thong of the Ayutthaya Kingdom. In 1817 the town centre was moved to the opposite bank of the Mae Klong River.

The district was one of the five original districts of Monthon Ratchaburi that were established in 1895 with Phraya Surinthararuchai (Thet Bunnag) as the first superintendent commissioner. At first the provincial administration was in Photharam District, but was moved to tambon Na Mueang in 1898.

== Geography ==
Neighboring districts are (from the north clockwise) Photharam and Damnoen Saduak of Ratchaburi Province, Bang Khonthi of Samut Songkhram province, Wat Phleng, Pak Tho, and Chom Bueng of Ratchaburi.

The main river of the district is the Mae Klong.

== Economy ==
Hin Kong Subdistrict is the site of the 1,400-megawatt Hin Kong Power Plant, a gas-fired combined-cycle power station operated by Ratch Group and Gulf Energy Development. The project was approved by the Energy Regulatory Commission (ERC) in 2019 and developed under a 25-year power purchase agreement with the state-run Electricity Generating Authority of Thailand (EGAT). Construction began in 2020 with an investment cost estimated at US $700 million (21.7 billion baht). The first 700-MW unit began commercial operation in March 2024 and the second in January 2025. The 1,400-MW facility supplies electricity to Thailand’s central power grid and forms part of the country’s 2018 Power Development Plan, intended to improve generation efficiency and support natural-gas-based transition energy policy.

== Administration ==
The district is divided into 22 sub-districts (tambons), which are further subdivided into 187 villages (muban). The town (thesaban mueang) Ratchaburi covers the complete tambon Na Mueang. The township (thesaban tambon) Khao Ngu covers parts of tambons Chedi Hak and Ko Phlapphla. Lak Mueang covers Khok Mo, Phong Sawai, Huai Chinsi and all of Ang Thong. There are a further 18 tambon administrative organizations (TAO).

1.	Na Mueang	หน้าเมือง
2.	Chedi Hak	เจดีย์หัก
3.	Don Tako	ดอนตะโก
4.	Nong Klang Na	หนองกลางนา
5.	Huai Phai	ห้วยไผ่
6.	Khung Nam Won	คุ้งน้ำวน
7.	Khung Krathin	คุ้งกระถิน
8.	Ang Thong	อ่างทอง
9.	Khok Mo	โคกหม้อ
10.	Sam Ruean	สามเรือน
11.	Phikun Thong	พิกุลทอง
12.	Nam Phu	น้ำพุ
13.	Don Rae	ดอนแร่
14.	Hin Kong	หินกอง
15.	Khao Raeng	เขาแร้ง
16.	Ko Phlapphla	เกาะพลับพลา
17.	Lum Din	หลุมดิน
18.	Bang Pa	บางป่า
19.	Phong Sawai	พงสวาย
20.	Khu Bua	คูบัว
21.	Tha Rap	ท่าราบ
22.	Ban Rai	บ้านไร่

== Environment ==
Since at least 2001, villagers of tambon Nam Pu have complained about toxic wastewater from an industrial waste treatment plant they suspected of contaminating their water. Wax Garbage Recycle Centre, an industrial waste treatment plant, began its operation in the upstream area of Nam Pu Creek about the same time as contamination became evident. The pollution spread to tambon Rang Bua of Chom Bueng district. Responding to complaints, the Thai Pollution Control Department tested creek water and groundwater. It found that levels of heavy metals (lead, nickel, and barium) exceeded their standards. They also found high levels of volatile organic compounds (VOC) such as toluene, xylene, ethylbenzene, benzene and cis-1,2-dichloroethylene. The Department of Industrial Works and Ratchaburi's Industry Office, since 2002, have sent 19 letters ordering the plant to improve its operation, and at least six orders for the plant to shut down parts of its facility. Despite efforts by the authorities, the plant is still in operation and toxic wastewater contamination continues unabated.
