= Ratchaburi province =

Coordinates: 13°31′44″N 99°48′52″E

Ratchaburi ราชบุรี
- Province

Other transcription(s)
  - Chinese: 叻丕 lêh4 pi2 (Teochew Peng'im)
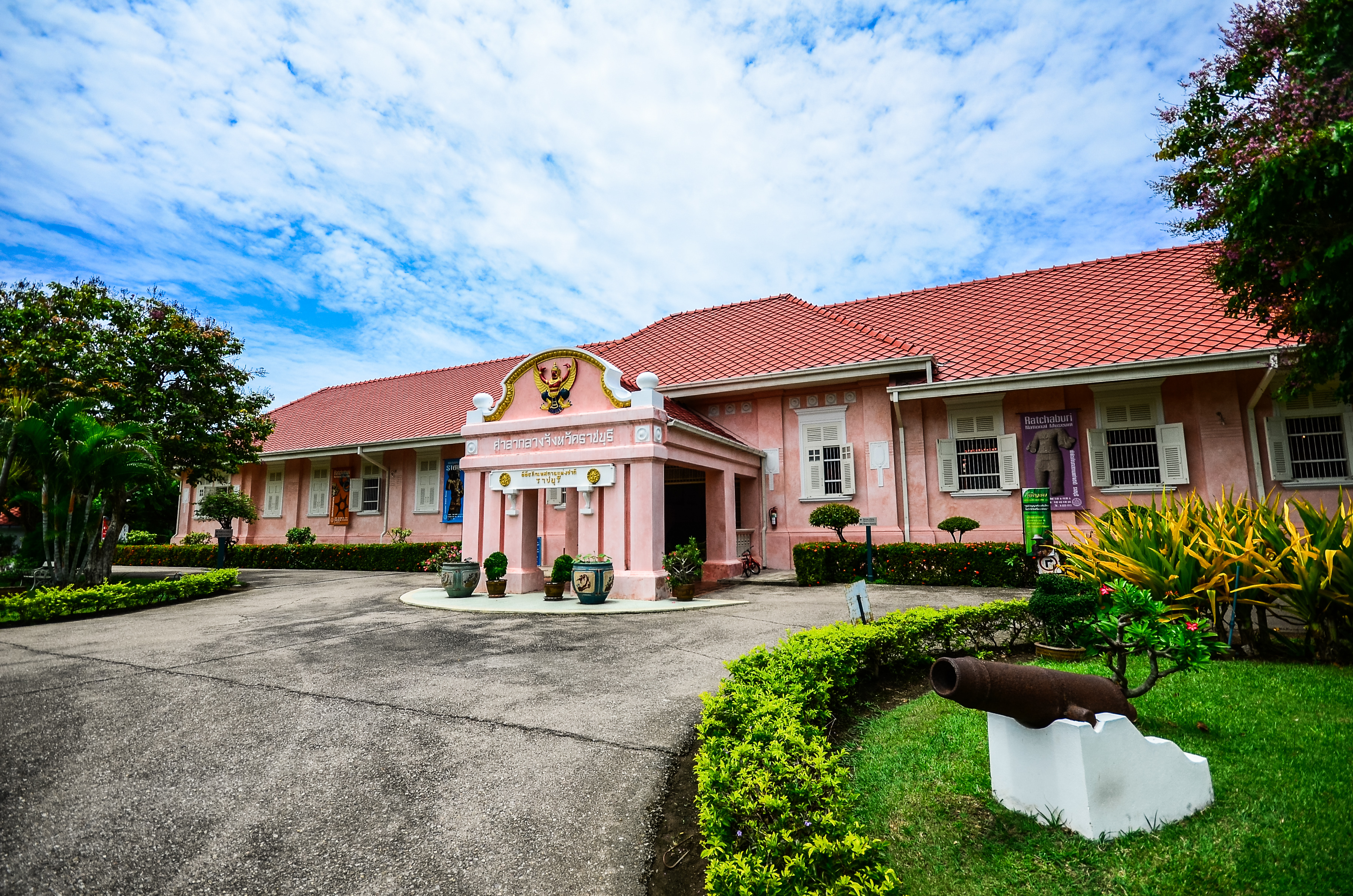
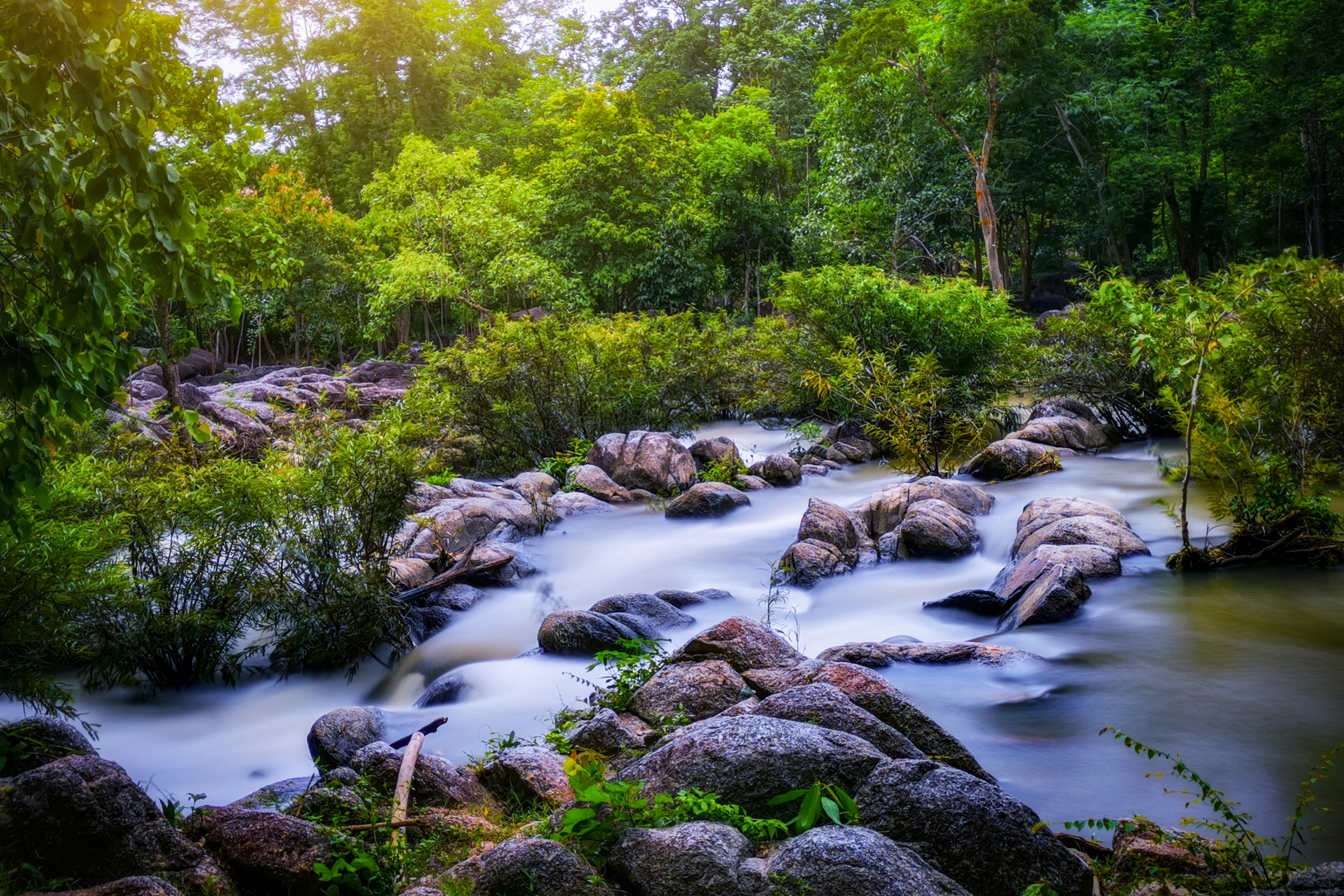
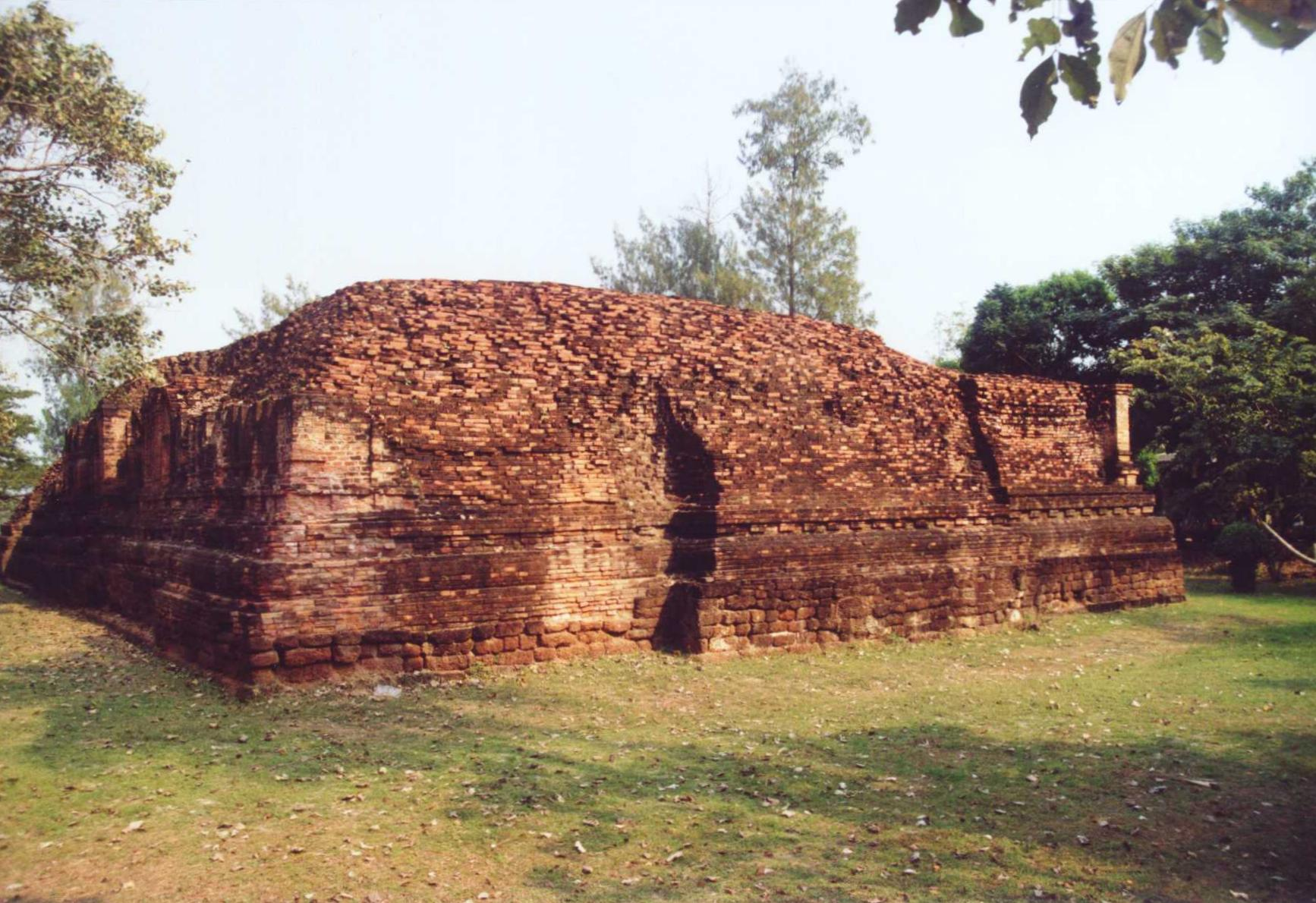
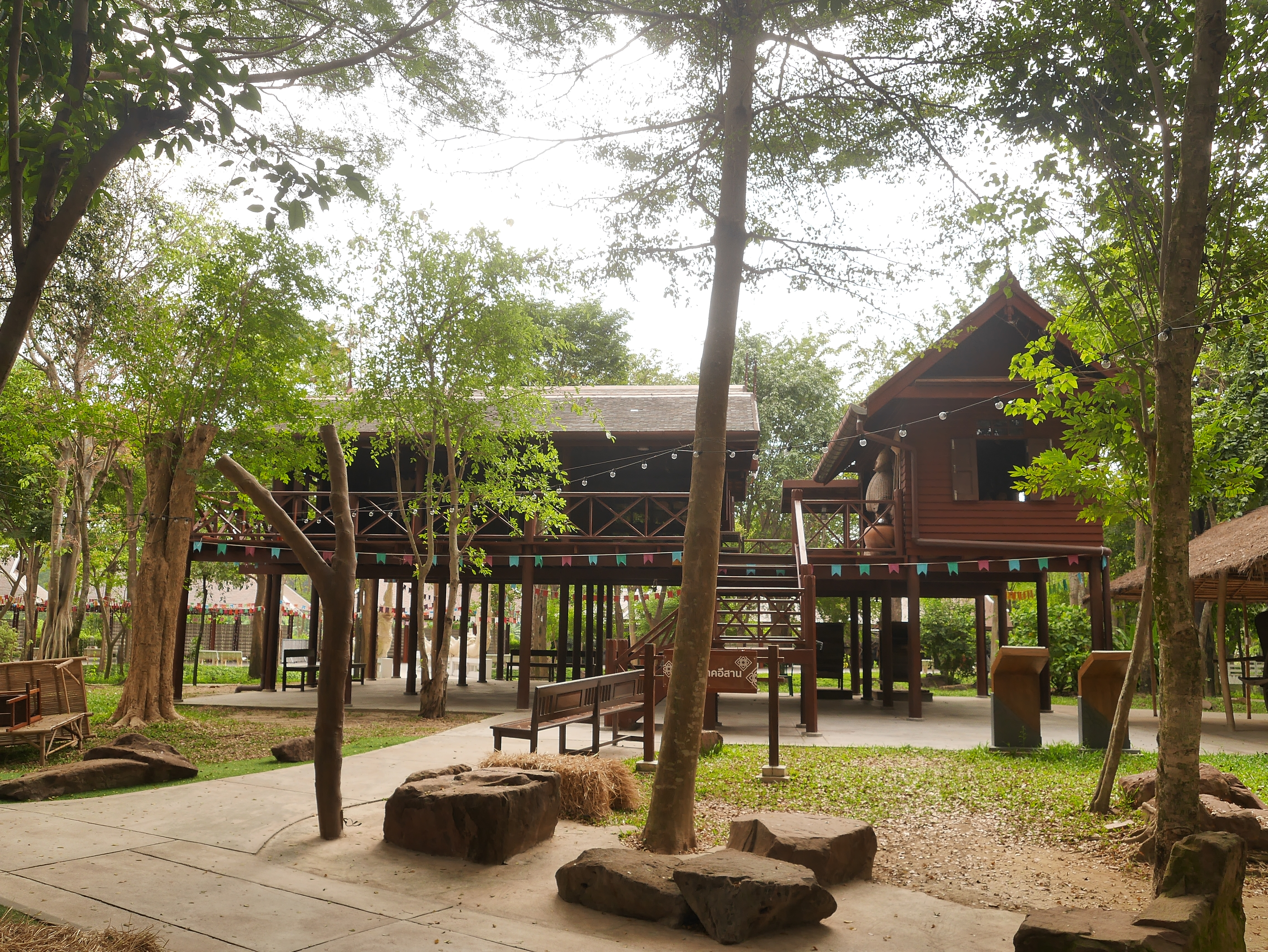
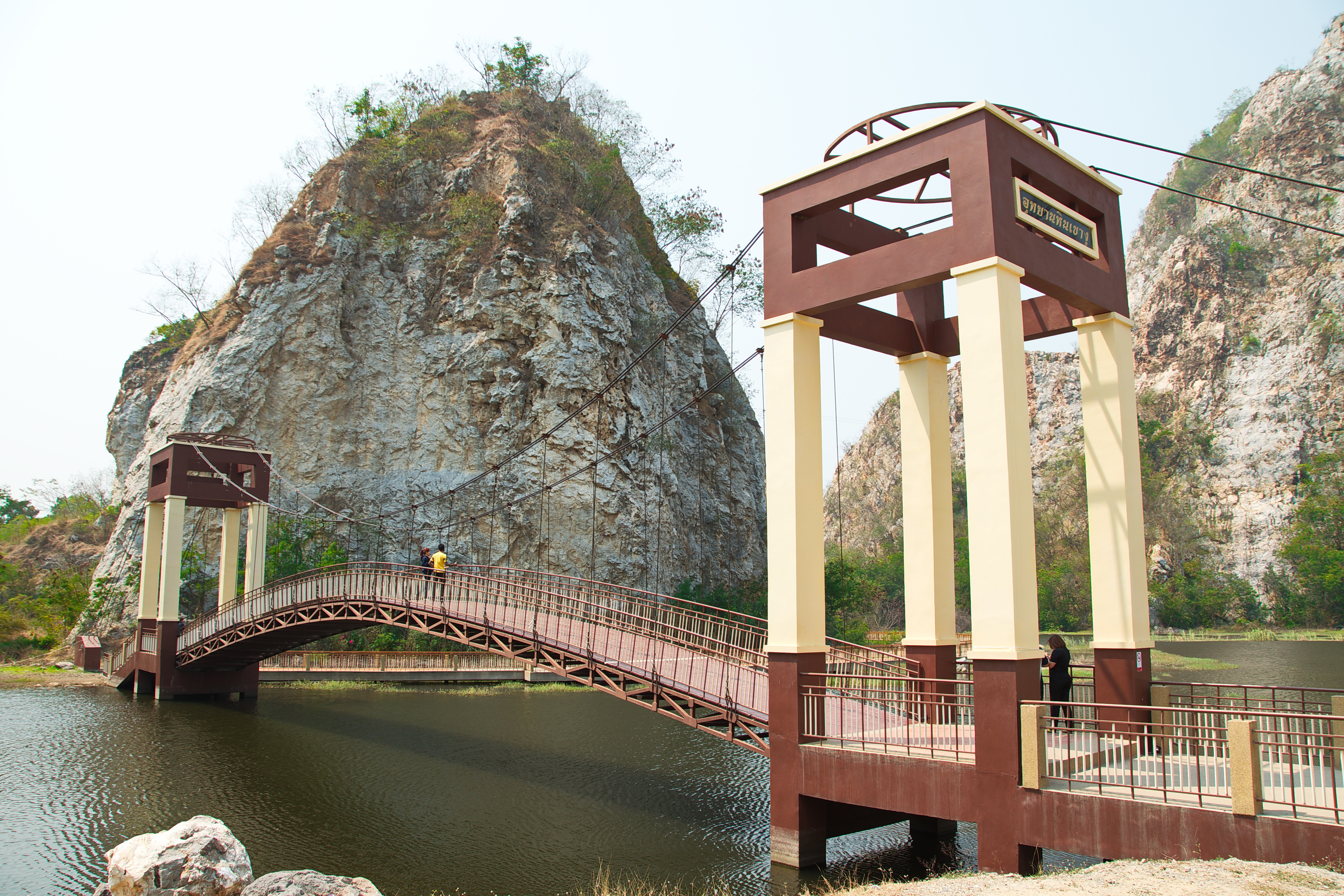
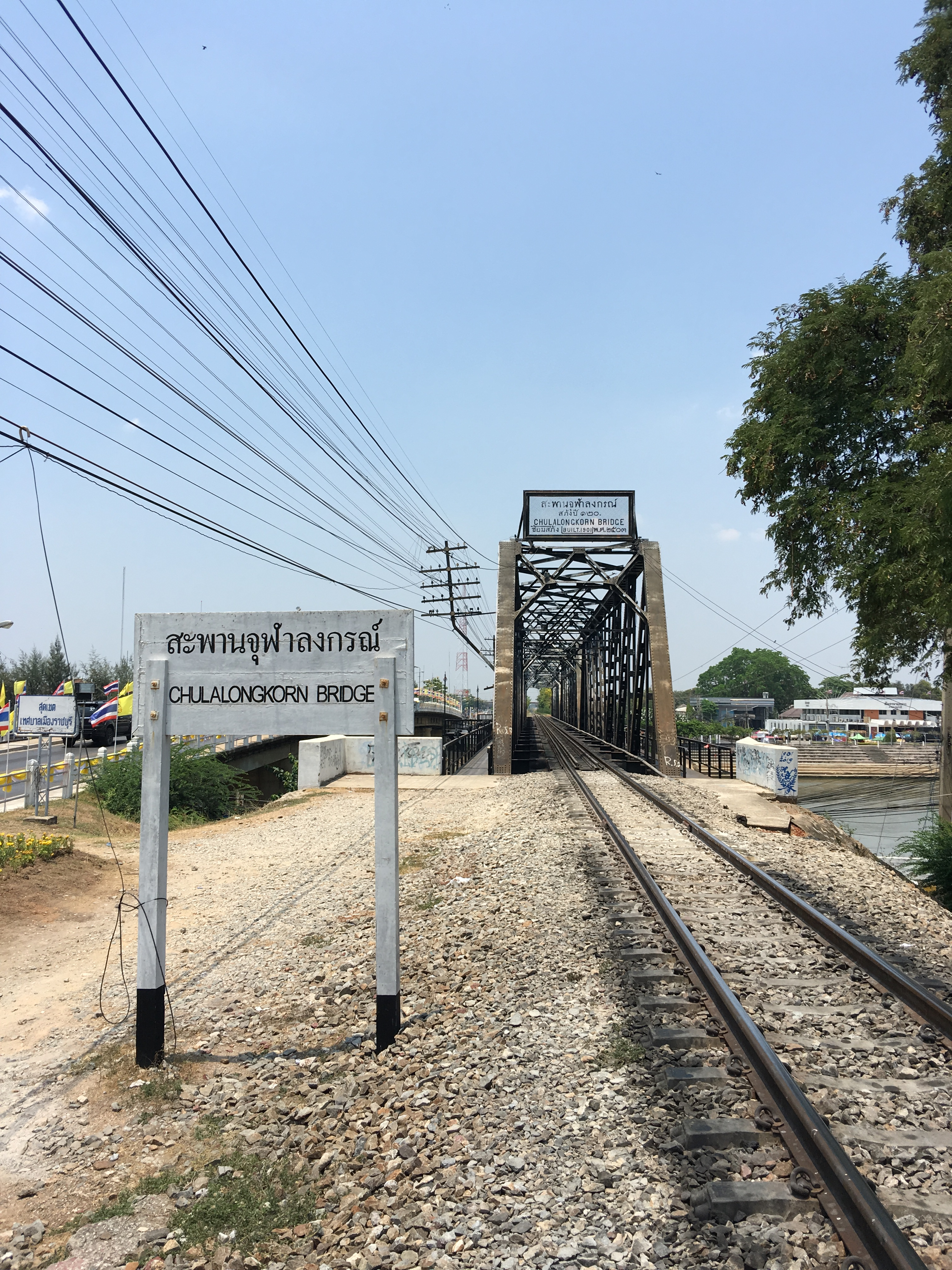
- From top: Old Ratchaburi Provincial Hall, now Ratchaburi National Museum; Kaeng Som Maew, a large stone islet in the Phachi River; Wat Khlong, the largest ruin of Khu Bua; Na Satta Thai Park; Khao Ngu Stone Park; Chulalongkorn Bridge, the railway bridge spans across the Mae Klong River in the Ratchaburi town

- Flag Seal
- Nickname: Mueang Ong (Thai: เมืองโอ่ง) (lit. City of Jars)
- Mottoes: คนสวยโพธาราม คนงามบ้านโป่ง เมืองโอ่งมังกร วัดขนอนหนังใหญ่ ตื่นใจถ้ำงาม ตลาดน้ำดำเนินฯ เพลินค้างคาวร้อยล้าน ย่านยี่สกปลาดี ("Beautiful women of Photharam. Exquisite women of Ban Pong. City of dragon jars. Nang Yai of Wat Khanon. Sensational caves. Damnoen (Saduak) floating market. Amazing millions of bats. The area of good taste Jullien's golden carp.")
- Map of Thailand highlighting Ratchaburi province
- Country: Thailand
- Capital: Ratchaburi

Government
  - Governor: Thitilak Kampha

Area
  - Total: 5,189 km^{2} (2,003 sq mi)
  - Rank: 43rd

Population (2024)
  - Total: ▼864,037
  - Rank: 27th
  - Density: 167/km^{2} (430/sq mi)
  - Rank: 18th

Human Achievement Index
  - HAI (2022): 0.6577 "low" Ranked 17th

GDP
  - Total: baht 173 billion (US$6.1 billion) (2019)
- Time zone: UTC+7 (ICT)
- Postal code: 70xxx
- Calling code: 032
- ISO 3166 code: TH-70
- Website: ratchaburi.go.th

Ratchaburi Provincial Administrative Organization องค์การบริหารส่วนจังหวัดราชบุรี
- Provincial Administrative Organization
- Interactive map of Ratchaburi Provincial Administrative Organization

Government
  - Type: Local administrative divisions
  - Body: Ratchaburi Provincial Administrative Organization
  - President: Wiwat Nitikanchana
- Website: ratchaburipao.go.th

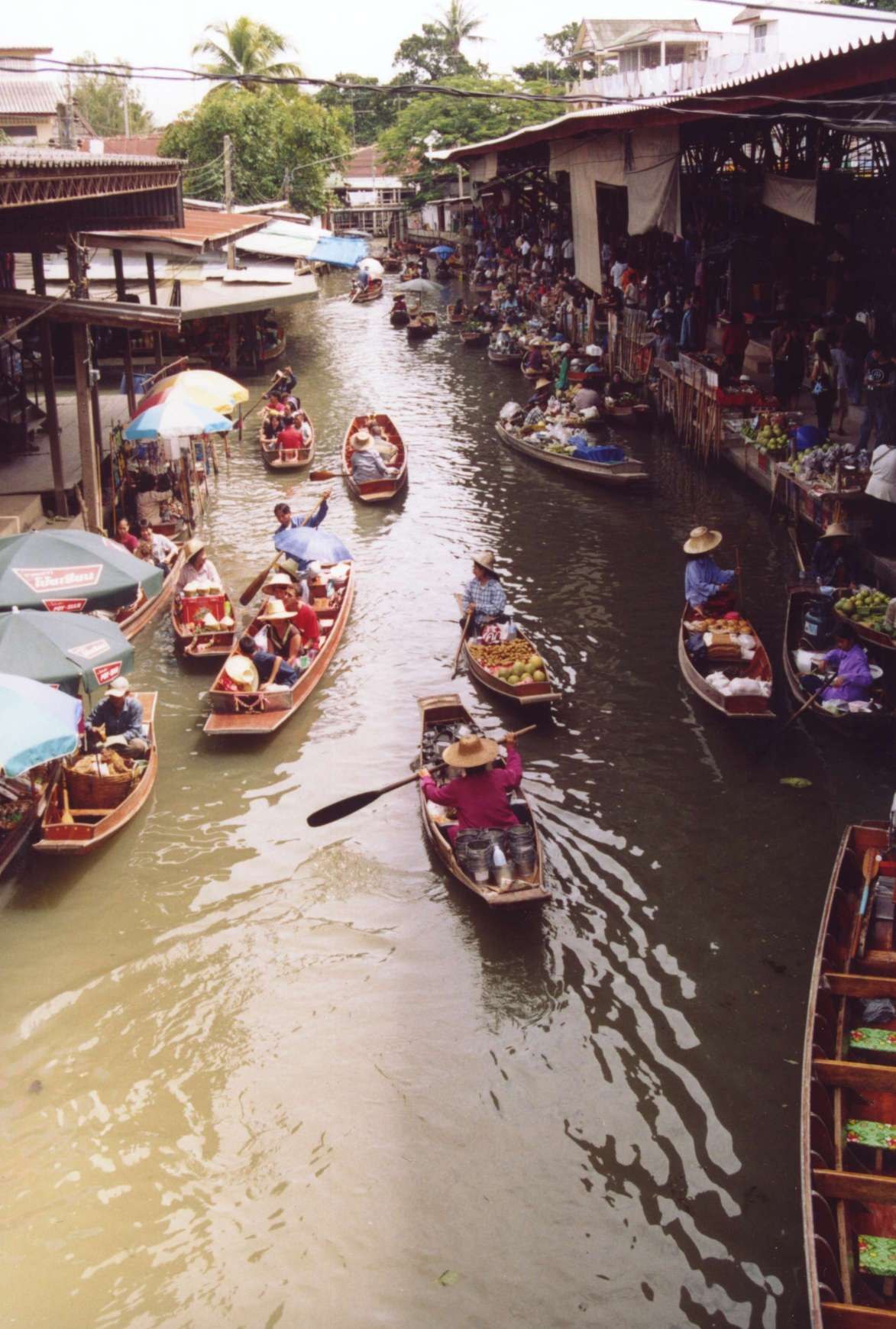
Damoen Saduak Floating Market

Ratchaburi province (Thai: จังหวัดราชบุรี, pronounced [t͡ɕāŋ.wàt râːt.t͡ɕʰā.bū.rīː]) or Rat Buri (pronounced [râːt bū.rīː]) is one of Thailand's seventy-six provinces (changwat) lies in Western Thailand. Neighbouring provinces are (from north clockwise) Kanchanaburi, Nakhon Pathom, Samut Sakhon, Samut Songkhram and Phetchaburi. In the west it borders the Tanintharyi Region of Myanmar.

Ratchaburi is 80 kilometres (50 mi) west of Bangkok and borders Myanmar to the west with the Tenasserim Hills as a natural border. The Mae Klong flows through the centre of Ratchaburi town.

== Geography ==
Ratchaburi province is a medium-sized province with an area of about 5,196 square kilometres (2,006 sq mi). The eastern part of the province contains the flat river plains of the Mae Klong, crisscrossed by many khlongs. The most famous tourist spot in this area is the Damnoen Saduak Floating Market. The west of the province is more mountainous, and includes the Tenasserim Hills. As the mountains are made mostly of limestone, there are several caves containing stalactites. Some caves are inhabited by large colonies of bats, and it is an impressive sight when they swarm out in the evening to feed. Other caves like the Khao Bin are accessible for visitors.

The area of Ratchaburi province is divided into three parts. First, the border in the west which is shared with Myanmar and is about 60 kilometres (37 mi) long. The second contains the Tenasserim mountains and forests with an elevation of about 200–300 meters. The central area of the province is rich in wetlands due to river flow. Ratchaburi has important natural resources in its forest of which it covers an area of 1,711 km^{2} (661 sq mi) or 33 percent of provincial area. Moreover, it has minerals such as tin, tantalum, feldspar, quartz, limestone, and marlstone.

The main river of the western part is the Phachi River. On the left bank of the Phachi is the Chaloem Phrakiat Thai Prachan National Park along with eight other national parks, make up region 3 (Ban Pong) of Thailand's protected areas.
There is one wildlife sanctuary, Mae Nam Phachi Wildlife Sanctuary, along with two other wildlife sanctuaries, make up region 3 (Ban Pong) of Thailand's protected areas.

- Chaloem Phrakiat Thai Prachan National Park, 329 km^{2} (127 sq mi)
  56,310 visitors in fiscal year 2024.
- Mae Nam Phachi Wildlife Sanctuary, 489 km^{2} (189 sq mi).

Location protected areas of Ratchaburi
Ratchaburi protected areas: / National park; 1 / Thai Prachan; / Wildlife sanctuary; 2 / Mae Nam Phachi

== History ==
The history of the city of Ratchaburi dates back to the Dvaravati period, when it was an important city of the Mon Kingdom. Of the city of Khu Bua nearby only ruins remains. According to legend it dates back to the mythical Suvannabhumi Kingdom predating Dvaravati.

"Ratchaburi" means 'the land of the king'. Ratchaburi dates back to ancient times and was important during the Dvaravati period. The city of Ratchburi is on the banks of the Mae Klong River and was a town of the Suvarnabhumi Kingdom.

From the evidence of archaeological sites and many antiquities, believed that people have settled in this area since the Middle Stone Age, as well as discovering an ancient city in the Dvaravati period at Mueang Ratchaburi district. King Rama I used to take a position of Royal Yokkrabat of Ratchaburi in the late Ayutthaya period.

In the late Ayutthaya period and early Rattanakosin period, there is historical evidence that Ratchaburi is an important frontier city, It is a battlefield for many ages. Especially during the reign of King Rama I has brought troops to set up the Burmese battle in Ratchaburi area many times, the most important one was the Burmese–Siamese War (1785–1786).

Later in 1817, In the reign of King Rama II has ordered to build a new city wall on the left bank of the Mae Klong River until the present. In the reign of King Rama V in 1894, has changed the government and included the city that are close together to set up as counties and included the city of Ratchaburi, Kanchanaburi, Samut Songkhram, Phetchaburi, Pran Buri and Prachuap Khiri Khan to set up as Ratchaburi county.

== Demographics ==
Hill tribes, mostly Karen living near the Myanmar border, make up about one percent of the population. Some Mon, Lawa, Lao, Chinese and Khmer minorities live in the province. Most Mon live in the upper part of the province like Ban Pong and Photharam districts, and tend to live along the river.

Ratchaburi is 98.3 percent Buddhist.

== Symbols ==
The provincial seal shows the royal sword above the royal sandals on a phan, as the name Ratchaburi means 'city of the king'. The name derives from the fact that King Rama I was born here. The provincial slogan is "Beautiful women of Photharam. Exquisite women of Ban Pong. City of dragon jars. Nang Yai of Wat Khanon. Sensational caves. Damnoen (Saduak) floating market. Amazing millions of bats. The area of good taste Jullien's golden carp." The provincial flower is the Pink Shower Tree (Cassia bakeriana), and the provincial tree is Wrightia pubescens. Jullien's golden carp (Probarbus jullieni) is the provincial fish, same as neighbouring province Kanchanaburi, that has good taste and flourished in the Mae Klong River in the past, but is now critically endangered.

== Transportation ==
=== Rail ===
The main railway station in Ratchaburi is Ratchaburi railway station.

== Health ==
=== Public ===
Ratchaburi Hospital is the main and largest hospital of the province, classified as a regional hospital by the Ministry of Public Health. In the lower tier, three general hospitals are located in Ratchaburi: Ban Pong Hospital, Photharam Hospital and Damnoen Saduak Hospital. The remaining six districts are served by community hospitals.

== Administrative divisions ==
Map of ten districts

=== Provincial government ===
The province is divided into 10 districts (amphoes). The districts are further subdivided into 104 sub-districts (tambons) and 935 villages (mubans).

1. Mueang Ratchaburi
2. Chom Bueng
3. Suan Phueng
4. Damnoen Saduak
5. Ban Pong
6. Bang Phae
7. Photharam
8. Pak Tho
9. Wat Phleng
10. Ban Kha

=== Local government ===
As of 26 November 2019 there are: one Ratchaburi Provincial Administration Organisation (ongkan borihan suan changwat) and 34 municipal (thesaban) areas in the province. Ratchaburi, Ban Pong, Tha Pha and Photharam have town (thesaban mueang) status. Further 30 subdistrict municipalities (thesaban tambon). The non-municipal areas are administered by 77 Subdistrict Administrative Organisations - SAO (ongkan borihan suan tambon).

== Human achievement index 2022 ==
Health	Education	Employment	Income
36	34	14	26
Housing	Family	Transport	Participation
57	41	22	29
Province Ratchaburi, with an HAI 2022 value of 0.6577 is "somewhat high", occupies place 17 in the ranking.

Since 2003, United Nations Development Programme (UNDP) in Thailand has tracked progress on human development at sub-national level using the Human achievement index (HAI), a composite index covering all the eight key areas of human development. National Economic and Social Development Board (NESDB) has taken over this task since 2017.

Rank	Classification
1 - 13	"high"
14 - 29	"somewhat high"
30 - 45	"average"
46 - 61	"somewhat low"
62 - 77	"low"

Map with provinces and HAI 2022 rankings

== Gallery ==
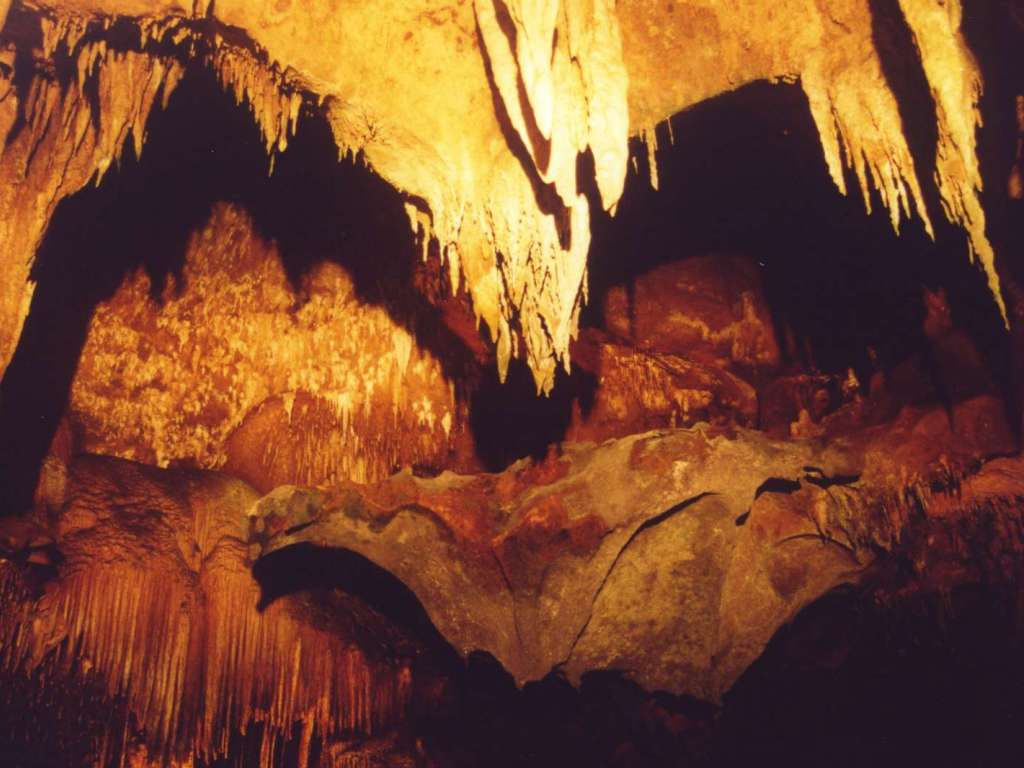
Khao Bin bat cave

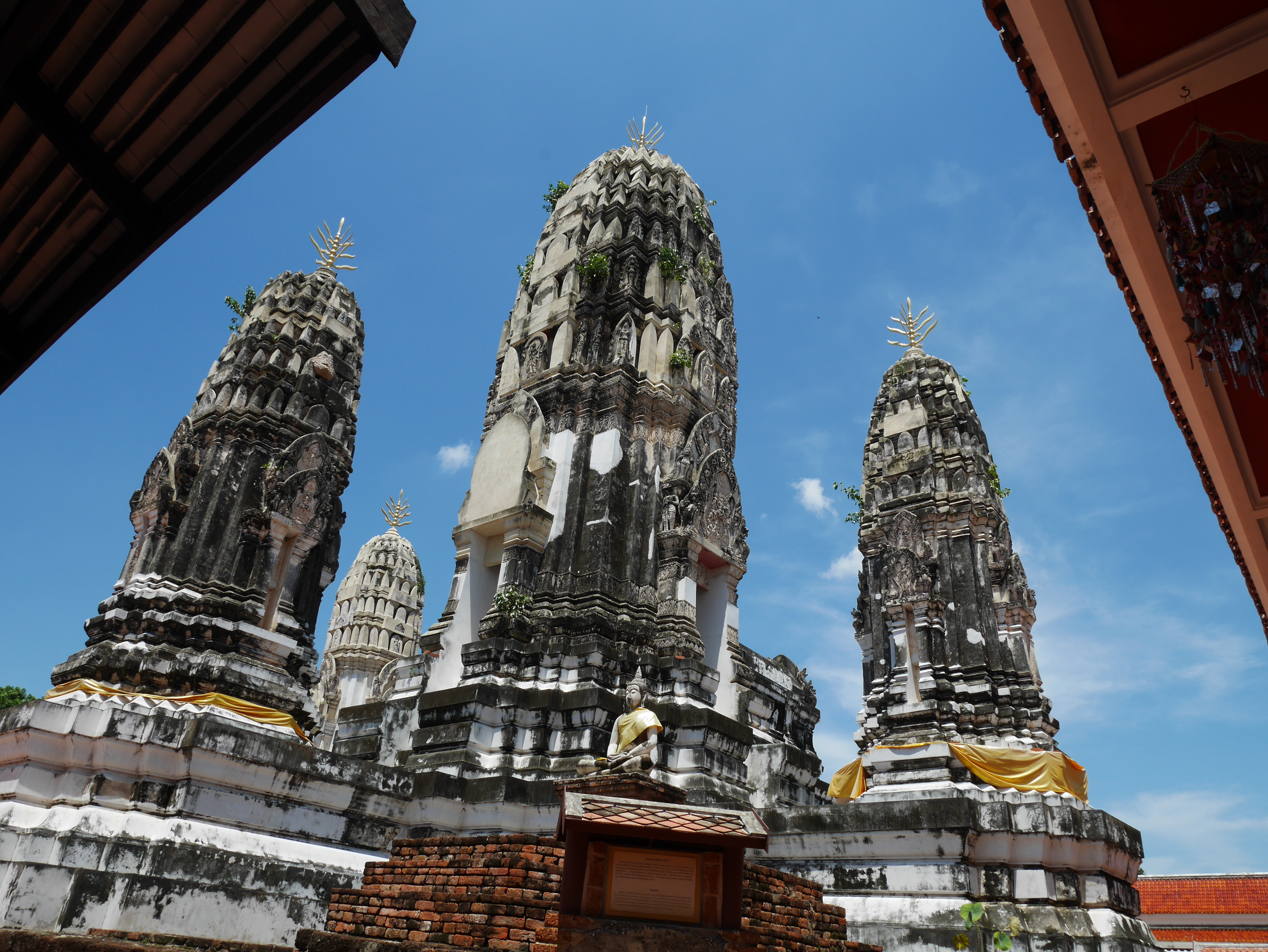
Wat Mahathat

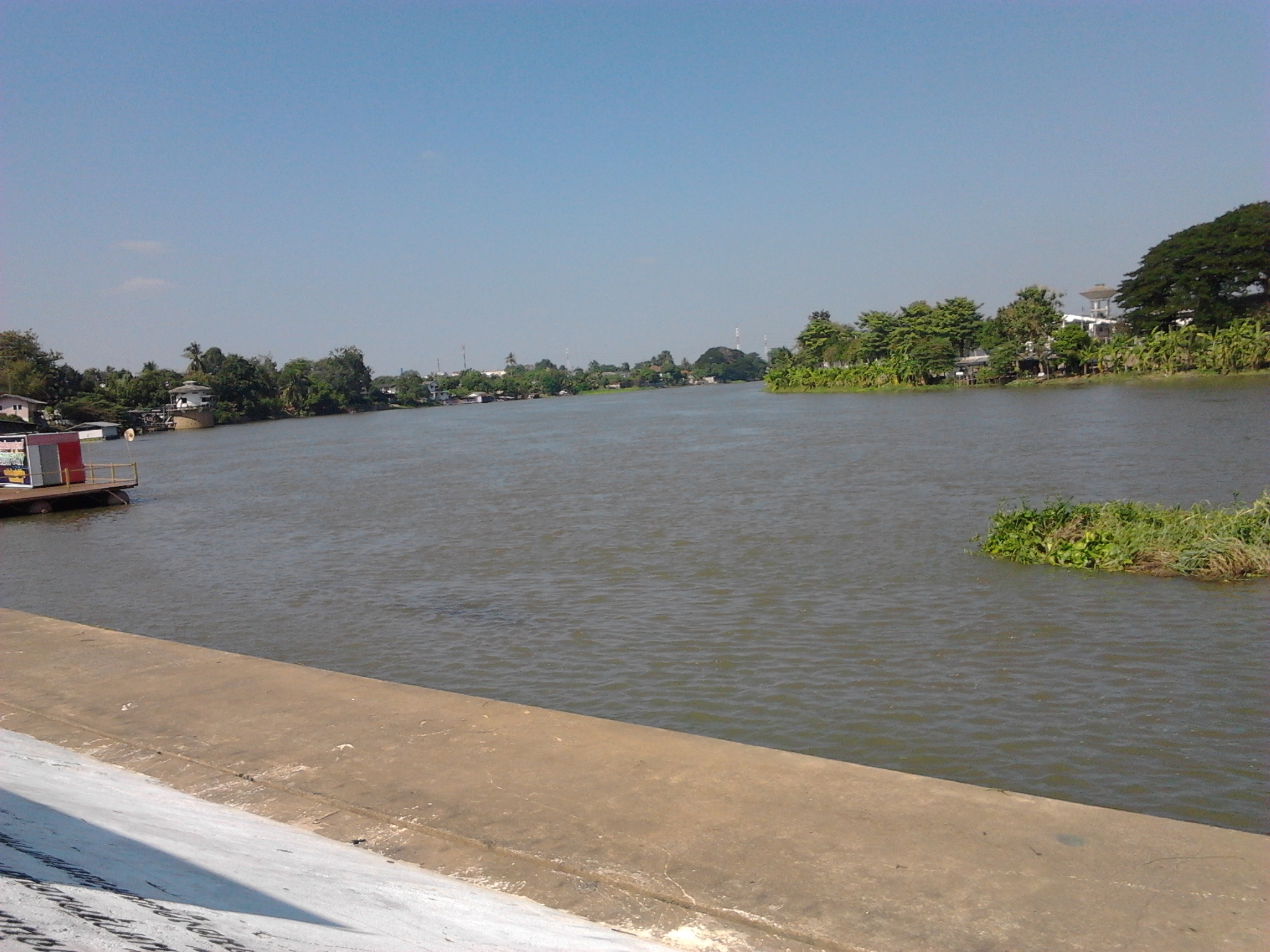
Bus terminal by Mae Klong, Ban Pong

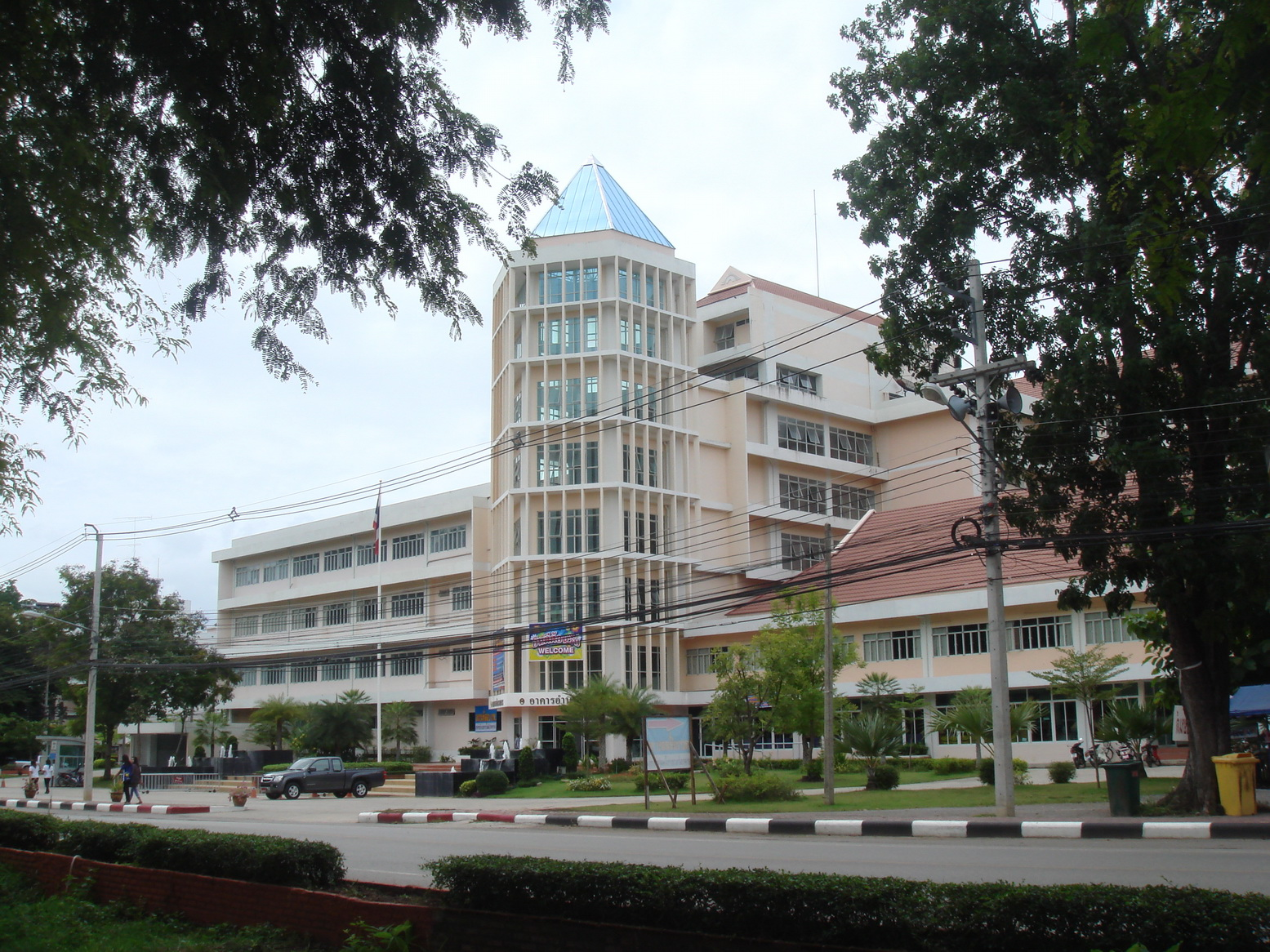
Muban Chombueng Rajabhat University, a branch of Rajabhat University in Chom Bueng

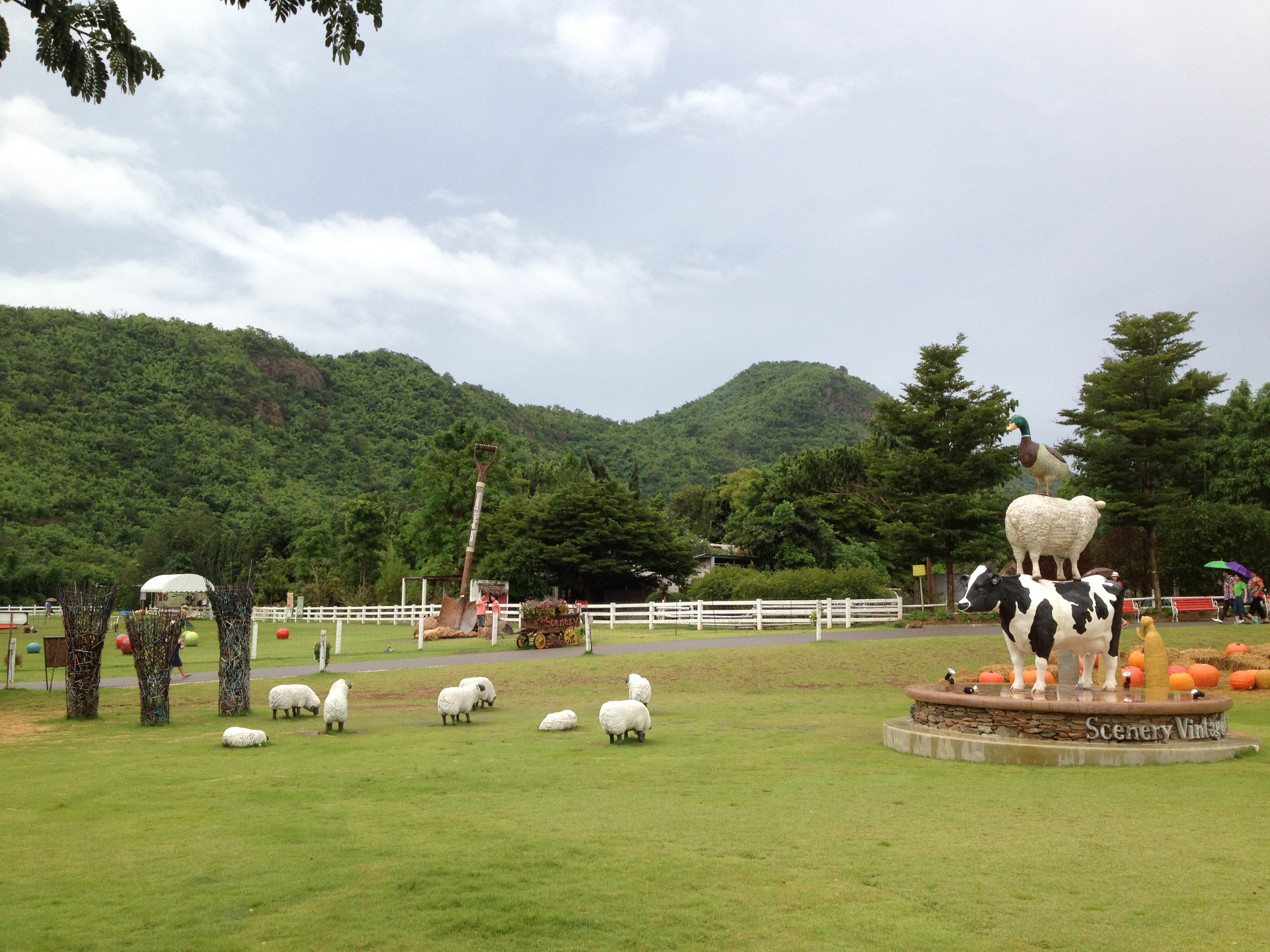
The Scenery Vintage Farm, resort of Suan Phueng

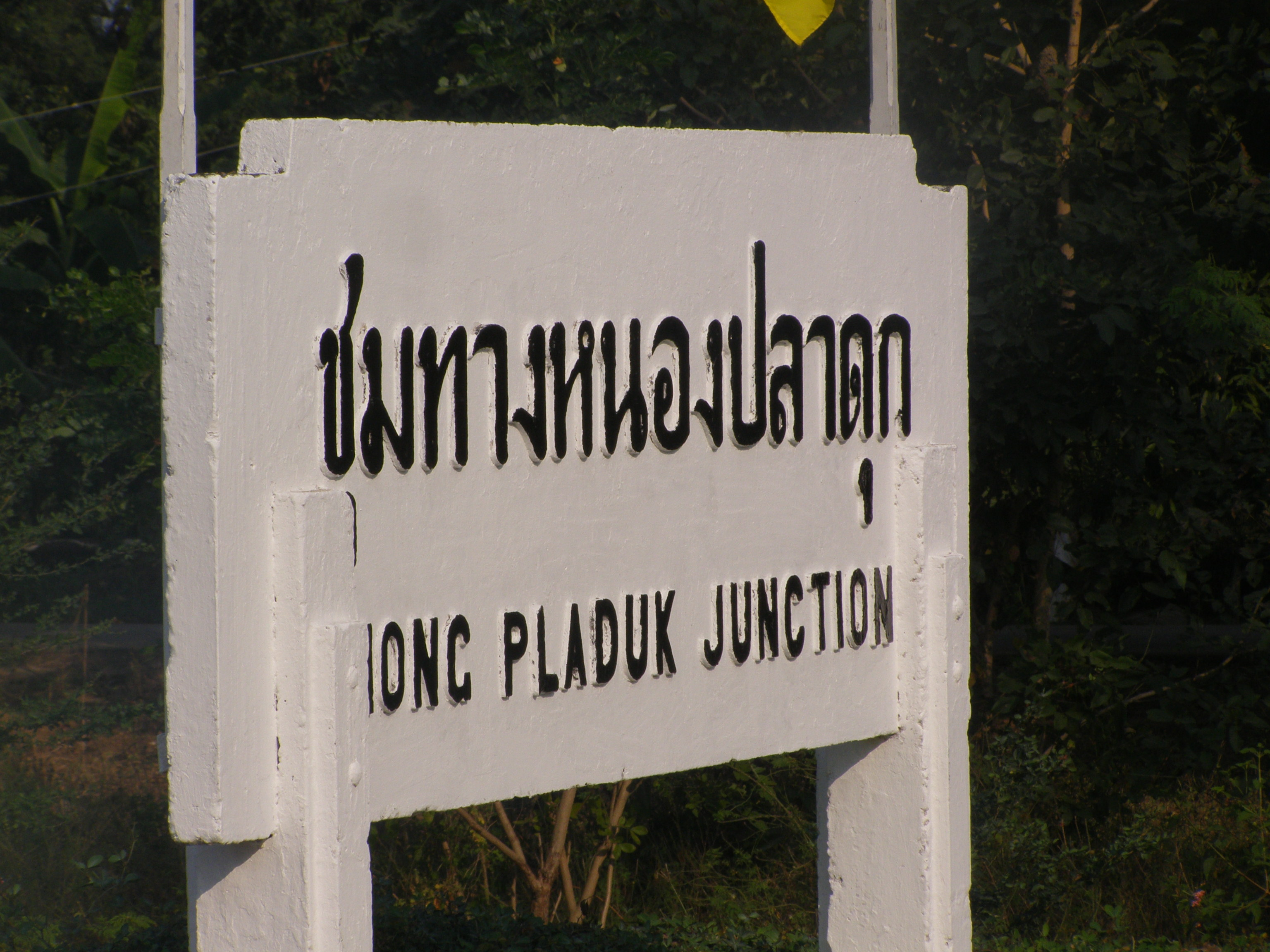
Sign of Nong Pladuk Junction Railway Station, the junction station of southern railway line and the starting point of the Death railway

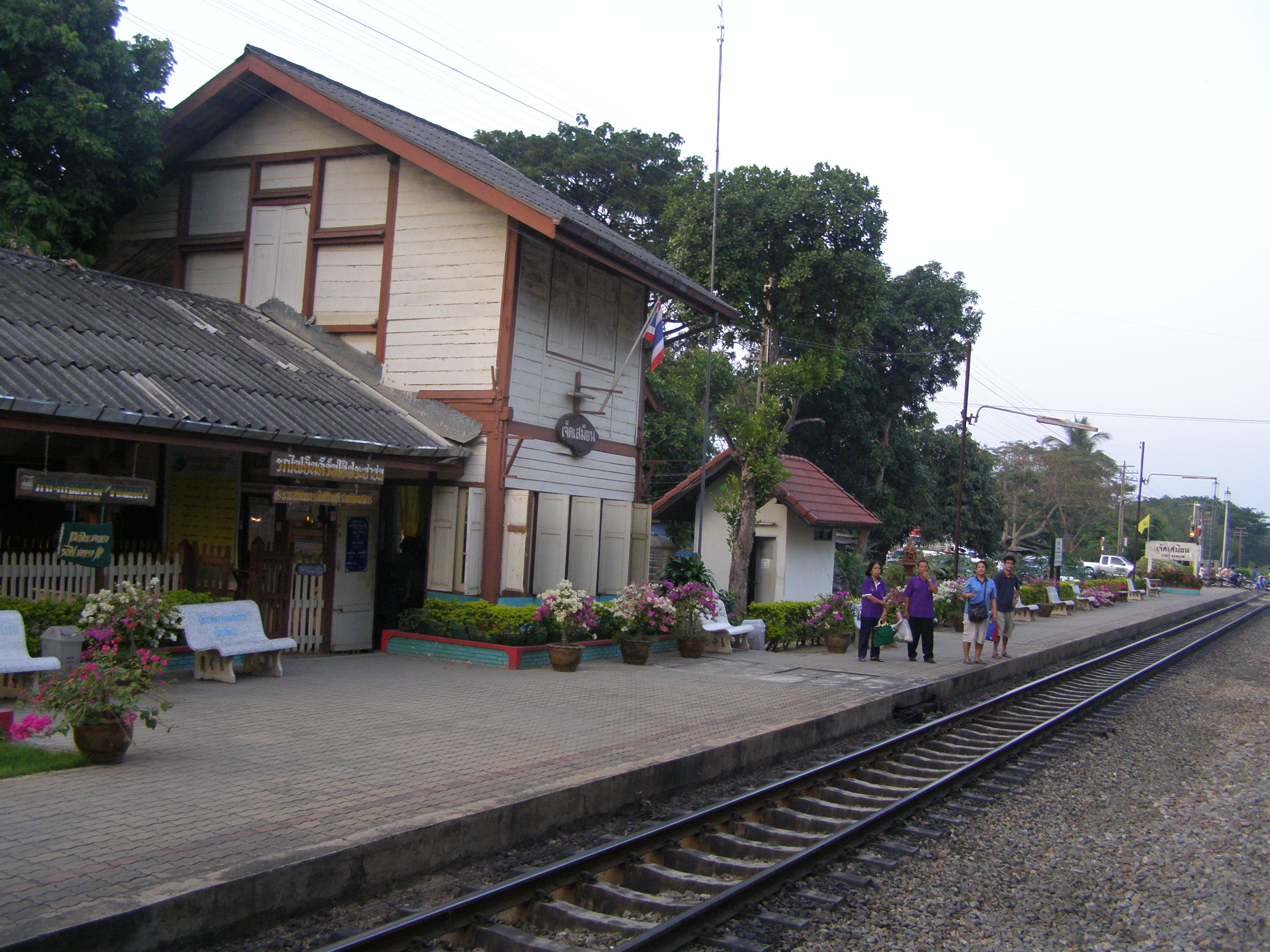
Chet Samian Railway Station, Photharam

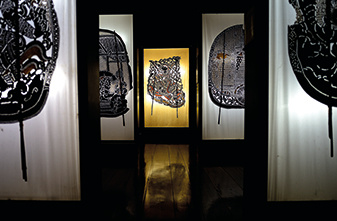
Nang Yai Shadow Puppet Museum in Wat Khanon, Photharam

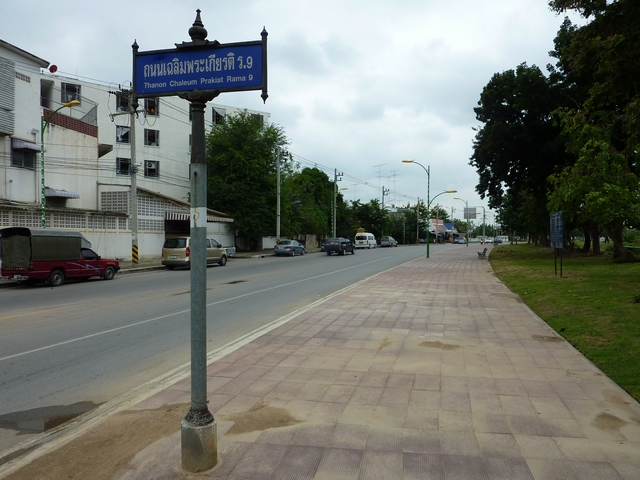
Chaloem Phrakiat Rama 9 Road, Ban Pong

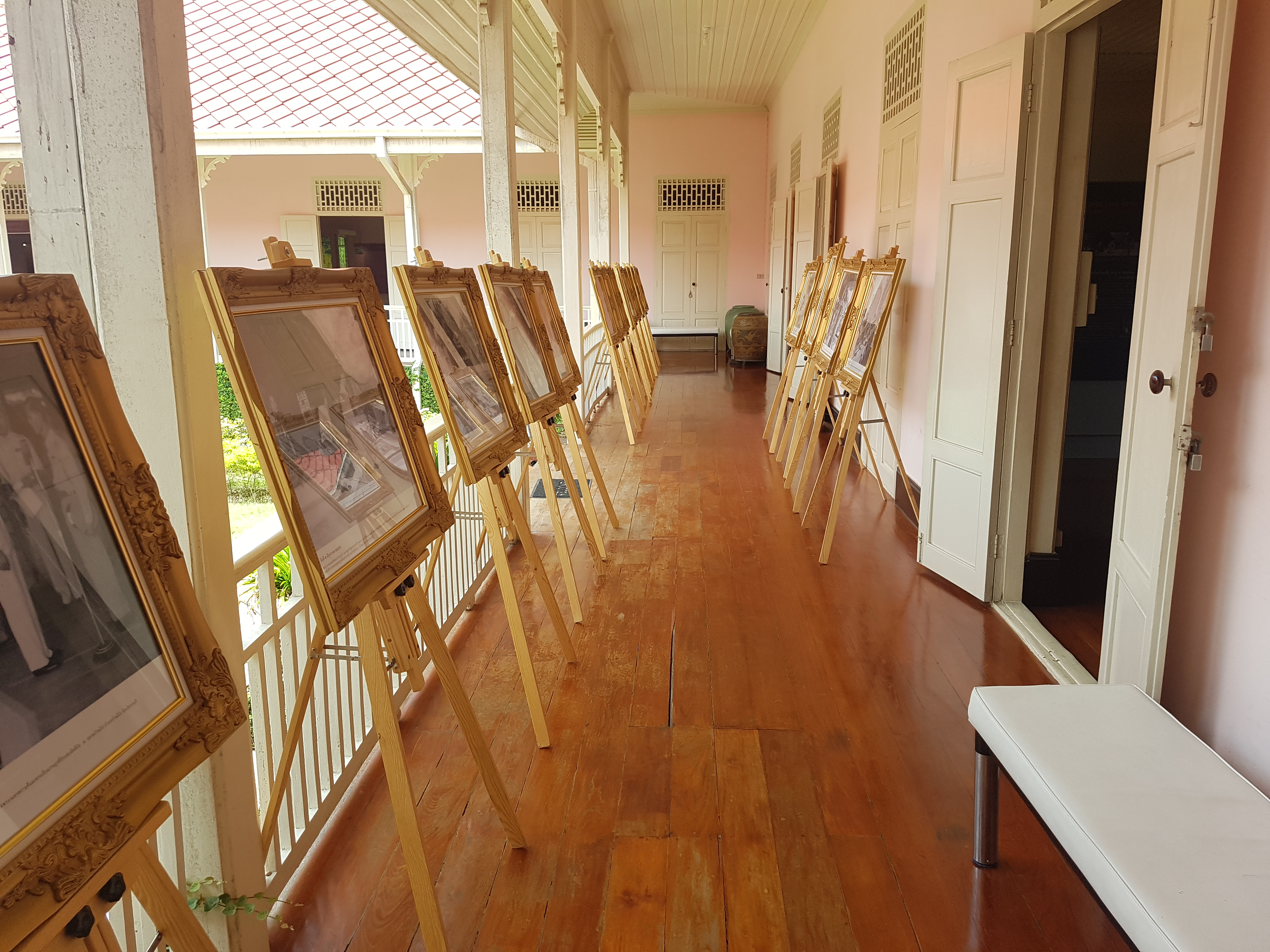
Corridor in Ratchaburi National Museum
