= Krasue =

Spirit in Southeast Asian folklore

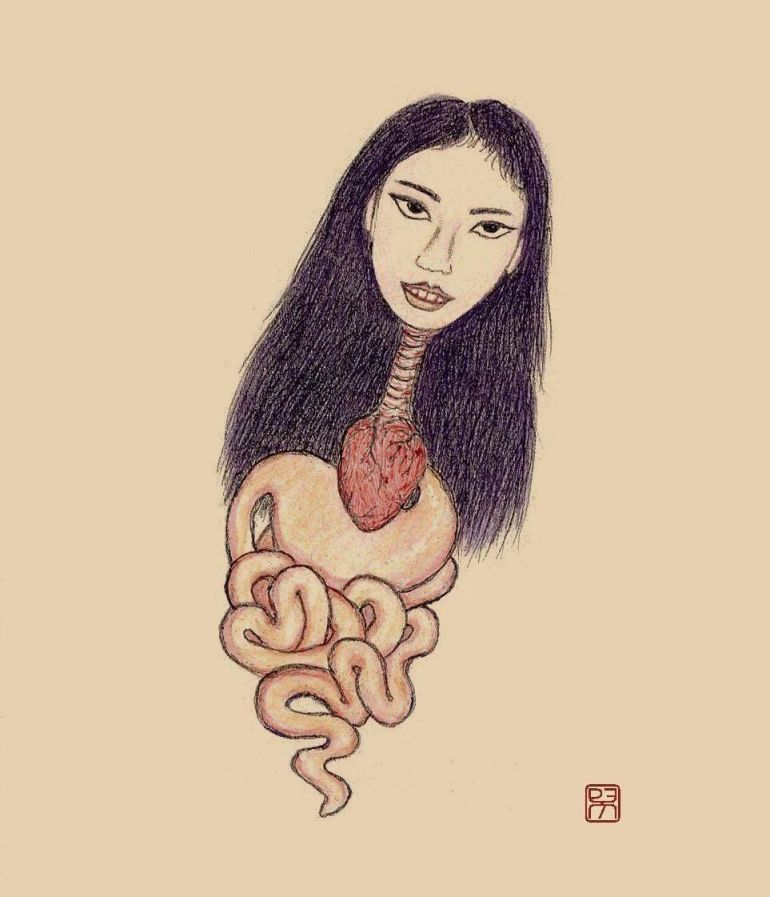
- A 2012 illustration of a krasue

Creature information
- Other name(s): กระสือ, អាប Ahp, Penanggal, Kuyang, Palasik, ‘’Capculacay’’
- Grouping: Legendary creature
- Sub grouping: Nocturnal, undead, luminescent

Origin
- Country: Thailand, Cambodia, Laos, Indonesia, Malaysia, Brunei, Singapore, Philippines, Myanmar, Vietnam
- Region: Southeast Asia (except East Timor)

The Krasue (Thai: กระสือ, pronounced [kra˨˩.sɯː˩˩˦]) is a nocturnal female spirit of Southeast Asian folklore. It manifests as the floating, disembodied head of a woman, usually young and beautiful, with her internal organs still attached and trailing down from the neck.

The Krasue belongs to a constellation of similar mythological entities across different regions of Southeast Asia; these regional variations all share in common that they are characterized by a disembodied woman's head with organs and entrails hanging from its neck. Along with the Krasue, there is the Ahp (Khmer: អាប) in Cambodia; the Kasu (Lao: ກະສື, pronounced [kā.sɯ̌ː]) in Laos; the Kuyang, Pok-Pok, or Leyak in Indonesia, as well as the Pelasik, Pelesit, penanggalan or penanggal, the last four of which are also found in Malaysia, Brunei and Singapore; the Ma lai (Vietnamese: ma lai) in Vietnam; manananggal is the Tagalog counterpart or the Creature with its lower half body being detached, The head detaching creature for the Maranao people is called "Kalibadot" and for the Visayans they are knowns as "ok-ok, ungga-ungga or Wugwug (because of the sounds the organs make while swaying midair) all are in the Philippines respective. Japanese folklore also has yokai creatures called nukekubi and rokurokubi that are quite similar to their Southeast Asian counterparts.

According to Thai ethnographer Phraya Anuman Rajadhon, the Krasue is accompanied by a will-o'-the-wisp-like luminescent glow. The explanations attempted about the origin of the glow include the presence of methane in marshy areas. The Krasue is often said to live in the same areas as Krahang, a male spirit of the Thai folklore.

This spirit moves about by hovering in the air above the ground, for it has no lower body. The throat may be represented in different ways, either as only the trachea or with the whole neck. The organs below the head usually include the heart and the stomach with a length of intestine, the intestinal tract emphasizing the ghost's voracious nature. In the Thai film Krasue Valentine, this ghost is represented with more internal organs, such as lungs and liver, but much reduced in size and anatomically out of proportion with the head. The viscera are sometimes represented freshly daubed with blood, as well as glowing. In contemporary representations her teeth often include pointed fangs in yakkha (Thai: ยักษ์) or vampire fashion. In the movie Ghosts of Guts Eater she has a halo around her head.

The Krasue has been the subject of a number of films in the region, including My Mother Is Arb (Khmer: កូនអើយ ម្តាយអាប). Also known as Krasue Mom, this Cambodian horror film has the distinction of being the first film made in the People's Republic of Kampuchea after the absence of locally made films and the repression of local folklore in Cambodia during the Khmer Rouge era.

In the Philippines there is a similar ghost, manananggal, a local spirit that haunts pregnant women.

== Legends ==
=== Origin ===
Belief in the existence of the Krasue is shared across Southeast Asia, and its origin is difficult to verify. However, it likely originates from folklore. In Thailand, the Krasue is believed to be a cursed individual (usually a female) who engaged in various sins and fraudulent conduct during her previous life. After she dies, her sins cause her to be reborn as a phut (Thai: ภูต) that has to live off wasted, uncooked or rotten food. In recent times, the Thai entertainment industry has fictionalized the origin of Krasue as cursed from an ancient Khmer princess, as in Demonic Beauty (2002). The kidnapped princess of the Khmer kingdom cheated on her husband (the general), with a soldier. The soldier was decapitated while the Khmer princess was burned to death. However, before she died, she chanted a spell to protect her mortal body but was only able to save her head and her organs. This depiction, however, is an attempt to reinvent the beginning of a well-known story of folk origin by adding a royal touch, for entertainment and commercial purpose.

There are other oral traditions which say that this spirit was formerly a rich woman, who had a length of black gauze or ribbon tied around the head and neck as protection from the sunlight. This woman was possessed by an evil spirit and cursed to become a Krasue. Other popular legends claim that the origin of the spirit may have been a woman trying to learn black magic, who made a mistake or used the wrong spell, causing her head and body to separate. Past sins are also related to the transmission of the Krasue curse; women who aborted or killed someone in a previous life would become a Krasue as punishment. Other folk stories talk about a person being cursed to become a Krasue after consuming food and drink contaminated with a Krasue's saliva or flesh. Popular imagination also claims that the transformation into a Krasue is largely restricted to the relatives of women practicing witchcraft "Mae Mot" (แม่มด) or "Yai Mot" (ยายมด), especially their daughters or granddaughters. Often, women acting strangely in a community are suspected of becoming a Krasue at night by other members of the village.

=== Cambodian folklore ===
អាប (Ahp/Aap), derived from a Sanskrit word आप्यति (āpyati, 'to cause anyone to suffer'), in Cambodian folklore is usually a woman who is half spirit and half-mortal. During the daytime, they appeared to look like normal human beings but during nighttime they ascended, leaving their mortal body with only their head and their organs, gravitating to find food. They were believed to feast on smelly things; blood, raw meats, villager's farm animals, corpses, feces, placentas, newborns, etc. Their weaknesses are thorns and guard dogs.

Ahp are witches who failed practicing powerful black magic, causing it to backfire and cursing themselves. Others believe that Ahp are black magic practitioners, borrowing a demon (evil spirit)'s power by letting them possess their body at night, as an exchange. Ahp have to pass their curse onto another woman to be able to enter the cycle of reincarnation; it could be their daughter, granddaughter, relatives or any other women that is in their womanhood also practicing witchcraft but some believe it could just be passed through the exchanged of bodily fluid to any women, usually tricked. Witches in khmer are called mae thmob (ម៉ែធ្មប់ 'mother witch') or yeay thmob (យាយធ្មប់ 'grandmother witch').

In order to protect pregnant women and their children from becoming victims, their relatives place thorny branches around the house as a barrier. This improvised thorny fence discourages the Ahp from coming to suck the blood and causing other suffering to the pregnant woman. After delivery, the woman's relatives must take the cut placenta far away for burial to hide it from the Ahp. If the placenta is buried deep enough the spirit will not be able to find it. It is believed that it would bring great calamities to the child and its family if an Ahp ate the mother's placenta.

=== Thai folklore ===
The Krasue is under a curse that makes it ever hungry and always active in the night when it goes out hunting to satisfy its gluttony, seeking blood to drink or raw flesh to devour. It may attack cattle or chickens in the darkness, drinking their blood and eating their internal organs. It may also prey on species of cattle, such as water buffalo that have died of other causes during the night. If blood is not available the Krasue may eat feces or carrion. Clothes left outside would be found soiled with blood and excrement in the morning, allegedly after she had wiped her mouth. Therefore, villagers would not leave clothes hanging to dry outside during the night hours.

The Krasue hides the headless body from which it originates in a quiet place because it needs to join it before daybreak, living like a normal person during the day, although having a sleepy look. To crush the still headless body of the krasue is fatal to the spirit. The flying head will return after hunting but rejoin with the wrong body which will lead it to suffer torment until death. If the top part of the body fails to find the lower half before daybreak it will die in terrible pain. The Krasue will also die if its intestines get cut off or if its body disappears or gets hidden by someone. Some folk beliefs hold that the creature can be destroyed by burning it. The main foes of the Krasue are mobs of angry villagers carrying torches and machetes. They may catch the Krasue and kill it or watch where she goes before dawn and destroy her body.

There is a legend said that the people who are wounded should be aware of the Krasue because it can smell the blood and will come to eat the blood at night when people fall asleep. However, there are ways to prevent the Krasue from coming inside the house. House-owners usually build spiky fences or grow spiky bamboo to protect themselves from the Krasue. The Krasue is scared of spiky things because it fears its intestines will get stuck and it will not be able to escape.

It is also believed that a true Krasue does not actually have a head or dangling internal organs, but is merely a green glowing light. If anyone is able to capture this light, for example, by covering it with a chicken coop, they can then bargain with it, demanding jewelry, gold, and other valuables in exchange for setting it free.

=== 21st-century sightings ===
- Around August 2008, a sensational story emerged about CCTV footage that allegedly captured a Krasue in action at a lemon juice factory in Khlong Sip Song, Nong Suea District, Pathum Thani Province. The factory's middle-aged owner explained that, prior to the incident, she had heard strange noises coming from the side wall of the factory during the night. Suspecting a thief, she installed additional security cameras. About ten days later, one of the front-facing cameras recorded something that clearly resembled a Krasue, accompanied by a glowing light. The object first appeared as an indistinct floating shape approaching from the side of the factory and gliding along the outer wall, maintaining a height level with the top of the wall. As it drew closer to the camera, its form gradually became clearer—until it distinctly resembled the face of an elderly woman with long white hair. The footage was timestamped at 11:27 p.m. on July 22. The factory owner added that when the footage was viewed on a mobile phone and zoomed in, it appeared as though the creature was using its intestines to snatch birds mid-air for food. Associate Professor Dr. Chawan Koopipat, a visual imaging expert at Chulalongkorn University, examined the footage and confirmed it was authentic and had not been altered. However, he believed the Krasue-like figure was likely an object reflecting light from an overhead source. As the light moved, the reflection struck patches of wet ground in the open rice field beside the factory—an area without any rice crops at the time, as it was during the off-season. Local residents claimed to have encountered a similar Krasue several times over the past year or two. The creature bore a striking resemblance to an elderly woman who had once lived alone nearby. After her death, the sightings stopped.
- In mid-June 2014, strange red lights were seen floating above the paddy fields in Phachi District, Ayutthaya Province, near Wat Tako. The lights were widely believed to be from a Krasue. Soon after, hundreds—and on some nights, even thousands—of teenagers flocked to the area, hoping to witness the phenomenon themselves. Their presence reportedly caused damage to the rice fields. The landowner, however, dismissed the rumors, insisting that there were no Krasue in the area. He explained that the lights seen were actually from floating lanterns used to scare away birds.
- In September 2015, an image circulated widely on social media, allegedly taken at Ban Phai village in Chae Hom District, Lampang Province. The photo appeared to show a Krasue with its guts and internal organs entangled in thorny branches. However, local residents quickly denied the claim, clarifying that no such village named Ban Phai exists in the area, and dismissing the story as fabricated.
- The death of a great number of chickens from mysterious circumstances at a farm in Nakhon Luang District, Ayutthaya Province, on the night of October 4, 2015 was blamed by local villagers on the activity of the Krasue.
- In February 2016, residents of Ban Don Pho Thong in Mueang Suphan Buri District, Suphan Buri Province, reported seeing strange lights floating at night, which they believed to be a Krasue. News of the sightings quickly spread, sparking panic among locals and drawing public attention to the area.
- In May 2016, villagers in Ban Khok Ta Kerd, Mueang Surin District, Surin Province, reported seeing strange green and red lights rising and falling above the paddy fields at night. The lights moved in a manner that puzzled residents and sparked rumors of supernatural activity. Later, in early August of the same year, residents of Ban Song Yang in Mueang Amnat Charoen District, Amnat Charoen Province, captured similar phenomena on their smartphones. Video clips circulating online showed red lights floating in the night sky, which many believed to be a Krasue.
- On the night of September 13, 2016, a middle-aged woman who owned a house in Ban Don Krasang, Tha Ruea District, Ayutthaya Province, returned home after a day of trading. As usual, she took a shower and sat down to watch television before going to bed. Suddenly, the dogs she kept began barking loudly and continuously. Curious, she checked the monitor connected to her security cameras and saw a mysterious glowing light floating in front of her house near a star gooseberry tree by the fence. Surprised, she wondered what it could be. She watched it for nearly an hour before it finally disappeared. She was about to go to bed when she was startled once again—the light appeared to float through the fence and into the property. Frightened, she called her neighbors for help, but they were too scared to come outside. She then contacted her father and some of his workers and asked them to come investigate. However, when they arrived, they found nothing at all. Ten days later, another mysterious light appeared on the security camera within the grounds of the house. This time, she was no longer afraid. She sent her teenage son outside to investigate. He later reported that it looked like a soft, pale glow, similar to a neon light, and that it floated away above the roof of the house. Local villagers believed that the phenomenon was a Krasue. The woman also recalled that during the three nights before the first sighting, strange events had occurred. Dogs had howled throughout the night, light rain had fallen continuously, and darkness seemed to arrive earlier than usual. In addition, chickens and cats kept by villagers had reportedly disappeared without a trace. Some observers suggested more ordinary explanations. They speculated that the light might have come from someone's flashlight outside the house, possibly a thief, or perhaps from spider webs reflecting light, or even an insect flying past the camera lens. However, according to tests conducted by a television program investigating the incident, these explanations did not match the observed phenomenon.
- By the end of 2016, an image circulated widely on Thai social media showing what appeared to be a human-like face on a tree at night, near a glowing light. The photo was reportedly taken in Buachet District, Surin Province. Many viewers believed the image depicted a Krasue, fueling local discussion and curiosity about supernatural phenomena in the area.
- In early 2017, a stampede of villagers on motorcycles rushed to Ban Lao Luang, Mueang Kalasin District, Kalasin Province, following reports of red lights floating approximately 100 metres (330 ft) above the ground. A video captured by a local resident showed the mysterious lights, though by the time it was recorded, the lights had already floated away. One man from Yang Talat District shared his personal encounter, saying he often ventured into the nearby woods at night. During one such visit, he looked up at the sky and saw a Krasue. Although he could not see the Krasue's face due to its long hair, he noticed its prominent long fangs and the glowing lights surrounding it. According to him, the Krasue escaped when he aimed his gun at it.
- In mid-July 2017, a video clip circulated widely on social media, showing an alleged entity floating at the height of a tree at night. The footage featured a security guard or police officer observing the strange figure with suspicion. No specific details about the video's origin were provided, and the context remained unclear. However, further investigation revealed that the “entity” was in fact a drone, decorated with a man's face to create a hoax.
- In mid-May 2023, a group of teenagers gathered near the edge of an irrigation canal in Chet Samian Subdistrict, Photharam District, Ratchaburi Province. Around midnight, the youngest among them spotted a strange red light floating nearby. One of the teenagers shouted "Krasue!" prompting the entire group to quickly flee the scene on motorbikes. The event was recorded by one of the teenagers and posted on TikTok, gaining attention online. An elderly local resident shared that the area had a history of Krasue sightings. This particular Krasue is known as "I Kueam" and is believed to float across the river from the opposite side.
- In mid-2023, a female smoothie vendor in Amphawa District, Samut Songkhram Province, took a photo of her boyfriend using her own mobile phone. In the picture, something resembling a woman's head illuminated by a green light was seen floating in the background. At the time, she did not think much of it. However, the following morning, her two-year-old niece pointed at the exact spot and exclaimed, "Ghost!" This made her start to believe that the photo might have captured a supernatural entity. The surrounding area is densely covered with coconut groves and water-furrows, with no vehicle traffic passing through. About 20 years ago, locals believed that the area was haunted by a Krasue. This recent incident has caused fear among residents, prompting the village chief to organize night patrols with officers and local volunteers to ensure community safety and peace of mind.
- In mid-October 2023, a series of eyewitness accounts describing sightings of a Krasue began circulating in Lopburi Province. At least three individuals, including two young women and a 70-year-old farmer, reported encounters with the spirit. Although most of the incidents occurred in mid-September, the stories began attracting public attention about a month later. The most detailed report came from the elderly farmer, a resident of Tha Wung District, who said he had a direct encounter with the Krasue on the night of September 18, around 1:30 a.m. According to him, it appeared as a woman in her 60s with shoulder-length white hair, baring her teeth at him. As he raised a shovel in defense, the entity floated away into the darkness. He claimed that it had tried to break into his duck and chicken coops. To test his suspicion, he said that on the night of October 13, around 9:30 p.m., he hung a duck carcass from a rain tree near his house. That night, the Krasue allegedly returned—not as the floating head of an old woman as before, but merely as a glowing light. It hovered toward the duck carcass, swiftly snatched it away, and devoured its intestines before vanishing into the dark. A neighbour reportedly witnessed the event alongside him. Another sighting came from a young woman in Mueang Lopburi District, who encountered the entity while waiting for her husband in a rice field on the night of September 19. She described seeing a glowing head with trailing entrails gliding along the surface of the water. She attempted to record the encounter on her phone but was only able to capture two blurry photos. A third witness, a 21-year-old woman who had recently given birth, said she was woken by her baby crying around 2:00 a.m. After tending to the infant and stepping out of the bathroom, she saw an eerie light outside her house. When she pulled back the curtain, she glimpsed something floating past. She noted that she had recently disposed of blood-stained sanitary pads in a garbage bag in front of her house—a detail that, in folklore, could attract the Krasue. All three sightings occurred in different neighbourhoods across two districts—Tha Wung and Mueang Lopburi—and the witnesses reportedly had no prior connection to one another. In the case of the elderly farmer, local authorities dismissed his account, claiming the figure he saw was likely a masked thief attempting to steal livestock. However, both he and the young woman insisted otherwise, maintaining that what they encountered was "definitely not human."
- In late January 2024, a 16-year-old girl in Rattanaburi District, Surin Province, used her mobile phone to take pictures of the night sky. In one of the images, she later noticed what appeared to be a Krasue hovering above a padauk tree. Shortly after, a local Facebook user shared the photo along with a warning message urging people to beware of the spirit's possible rampage. The post quickly gained attention, especially after several residents came forward claiming that they had seen similar sightings of the Krasue in the area before.
- On the night of October 12, 2024, between 10:00 and 11:00 p.m., a 37-year-old man who was guarding his cattle in a hut in a village in Phlapphla Chai District, Buriram Province, reported witnessing a strange light hovering above a nearby pond. At first, he thought it was a firefly. But as the light grew larger and floated closer, he saw what appeared to be a head with trailing intestines. He described being so terrified that he could not move. However, he managed to use his phone to record a video clip lasting about 30 minutes. He also claimed that he saw smaller glowing lights around the entity, which he believed were its "servants" bringing it food. The man emphasized that he was neither under the influence of drugs nor alcohol at the time.
- CCTV footage captured at 8:02 p.m. on August 9, 2026, in Surin Province shows a mysterious light slowly moving toward a village. According to the report, its movement appeared unlike that of either a drone or a floating sky lantern.

=== Krasue references in Thai culture ===
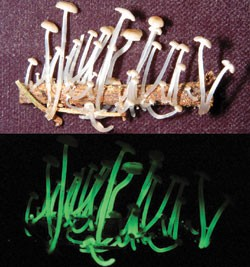
Glowing mushroom in Khonkaen province is called "Krasue Mushroom"

There is information from The Royal Academy which provides examples of how belief in the Krasue has been reflected in Thai culture for centuries, for example:

1. An abnormally tiny banana (caused by a mutation) is said to be eaten by a Krasue.
2. A gluttonous person who eats too fast is usually said to "eat like a Krasue" or to be "as gluttonous as Krasue".
3. Glowing mushroom in Khon Kaen Province is called "Krasue Mushroom".
4. In Chonburi Province, there was a village named "Nong Krasue" (Krasue marsh). The name was changed to "Nong Krasaem" (Happiness marsh) to make it less scary.

== Scientific explanation ==
A possible scientific explanation is that Krasue sightings are caused by blazing flames from methane gas particles emitted from rotten organic matter found in farms and fields, where Krasue sightings are commonly reported. However, according to Associate Professor Dr. Sirintornthep Towprayoon, a renewable energy researcher from King Mongkut's University of Technology Thonburi, the hypothesis that the Krasue is actually burning methane gas particles is impossible because not enough methane is emitted from rotten organic matter to be able to cause an ignition and that even if the methane gas particles did ignite, the burning would be confined to the surface of the organic, flammable matter and would not lead to floating flames that allegedly give the illusion of the Krasue.

When the head is pulled off from a real human body, other organs such as the intestines, heart, and lungs would not come off with the head.

== In media ==
=== Film and television ===
Countries where the Krasue tale is popular have adapted it to film. Several Thai films depict this spirit, including 1973 movie Krasue Sao (Ghosts of Guts Eater), Thai: กระสือสาว with Sombat Metanee, which features a fight between two Krasues, Krasue krahai lveat/Filth Eating Spirit' (1985) Itthirit Nam Man Phrai Thai: อิทธิฤทธิ์น้ำมันพราย (Oil of Eternal Life) made in 1984, with Tanid Pongmanoon and Praew Mardmarud, Krasue Kat Pop Thai: กระสือกัดปอบ (1990) with Bin Bunluerit and Trirak Rakkarndee, Krasue Krahailueat (Bloodthirsty Krasue), Thai: กระสือกระหายเลือด, made in 1995 with Thida Teerarat, Tamnan Krasue Thai: ตำนานกระสือ (Demonic Beauty) released in 2002, which ties the Krasue to a Khmer curse; Krasue Valentine (2006) by Yuthlert Sippapak, Krasue (The Gluttonous Fear) Thai: กระสือ made in 2007, with Jedsada Roongsakorn and Sirintorn Parnsamutr, Krasue Fat Pop Thai: กระสือฟัดปอบ (2009) with Chutima Naiyana, in which Krasue fights against Phi Pop, and Fullmoon Devil (2011) Thai: กระสือ by Komson Thripong. Krasue also appears in erotic movies such as Krasue Rak Krasue Sawat (2014) Thai: กระสือรัก กระสือสวาท and Wan Krasue Sao (2013) Thai: ว่านกระสือสาว In all these movies Krasue plays a central role, but she also appears in many other movies in lesser roles, such as in Phi Ta Wan Kap Achan Ta Bo (2008) Thai: ผีตาหวานกับอาจารย์ตาโบ๋, among others. More recently, the Krasue appears in the 2019 horror film Inhuman Kiss (Thai: แสงกระสือ), and its 2023 sequel, Inhuman Kiss: The Last Breath (Thai: แสงกระสือ2), released in Thailand on 30 March 2023.

Krasue, as Ahp (also spelt Arp or Aap), is present in the Cambodian horror films Neang Arp (Lady Vampire) (2004), Tiyen Arp រឿង ទាយាទអាប (Heredity of Krasue) (2007), Arp Kalum (The Sexiest Ahp) (2009) and Phlerng Chhes Arp Ahp Wearing A Helmet Season 1 រឿង អាបពាក់មួកសុវត្ថិភាព វគ្គ១ Ahp Wearing A Helmet Season 2 រឿង អាបពាក់មួកសុវត្ថិភាព វគ្គ2 (Released in 2012) Hong Kong's Witch with the Flying Head (飛頭魔女) (1977), which includes a Krasue spitting flames and firing laser beams and that was dubbed in Thai as Krasue Sawat (กระสือสวาท), meaning "Lovely Krasue", and Indonesia's Mystics in Bali (1981) also feature local versions of Krasue. In the Vietnam War-era drama Freedom Deal by Camerado, President Nixon orders the 1970 military incursion into Cambodia, unwittingly unleashing a legion of local ghosts similar to the Krasue.

This ghost appears periodically in Thai television soap operas (ละคร). Krasue, a popular lakhon aired between 20 December 1994 and 21 March 1995, as well as the more recent Krasue Mahanakhon (กระสือมหานคร) —in which the ghost story for a change is against a background of young city people instead of the usual rural or traditional setting— feature a Krasue in the central role. The theme song of the 1994 Krasue TV soap opera became very famous. There was a remake in 2011 named Krasue Cham Sin (กระสือจำศีล), but it was poorly cast and produced, not being able to reach the popularity of the 1994 lakhon. A Krasue has been also comically featured in a Sylvania light bulb commercial for Thai audiences and in a more recent dietary supplement ad. A rather ugly Krasue also appears in the animated film Nak.

The American anthology streaming television series Creepshow features a Krasue in the season three episode "Drug Traffic". (Note: An article by Decider identifies the entity depicted in the episode as a Krasue, while an article by Bloody Disgusting identifies it as the similar penanggalan.)

=== Others ===
Representations of Krasue, often humorous, are very common in Thai comic books.

Since the Krasue is a popular subject in some places of Southeast Asia, especially in Thailand, there are even costumes, dolls, keyholders and lamps sold and worn in Krasue form.

A Krasue features as the main antagonist of the 2013 horror game Eyes: The Horror Game. This interpretation shows the Krasue as a woman who was abused by her father to the point of death, being reincarnated as a ghost to enact revenge. The Krasue lurks around an abandoned mansion, where the player acts as the role of a thief, where they must retrieve an allocated amount of money bags (depends on difficulty), before being able to leave. The game's story-line, has some reference to the original folktale story, as the story talks of a "curse", and "flames", which is supposedly trapped in a photo.

As of September 3, 2025, the Krasue is a playable killer in the online multiplayer game Dead by Daylight. She can switch between a normal human form and a 'head form', where she looks like the conventional Krasue. In 'head form' she is depicted with a bloody head, missing skin and flesh, with white eyes, a bare throat, a heart, lungs, a liver, a stomach and intestines. In 'head mode' she moves by floating and is also able to attack and infect the other players with her intestines, which she can freely control like tentacles. The 'survivors' can find glowing mushrooms, similar to the glowing mushrooms found in Khon Kaen Province, which can be eaten to remove the infection inflicted by the Krasue player.

An enemy in Abiotic Factor, IS-0091-B, is nicknamed after the Krasue. It is a variant of the similar "Leyak", named for the similar creature in Balinese folklore. This enemy appears in cold areas and creeps up on the player slowly. It can be banished with "overclocked x-rays", after which it will drop a helpful crafting item. If not banished quickly, the Krasue will freeze the player in place and attempt to attack them. It was added in the 1.0 Cold Fusion update.

Krasue are also featured as the main subject of a quest in the second novel of the Dungeon Crawler Carl series.

== See also ==
- Dullahan
- Onryō
- Hungry ghost
- Leyak
- Langsuyar
- Nukekubi
- Manananggal (Philippine mythology)
- Penanggalan (Malay culture)
- Thai folklore
- Vengeful ghost

== Bibliography ==
- Chutima Pragatwutisarn (2010) (ชุติมา ประกาศวุฒิสาร), Evil Woman in a Beautiful Body: Femininity and the Crisis of Modernity in Thai Society, Chulalongkorn University
- Baumann, Benjamin (2013) Tamnan Krasue - Constructing a Khmer Ghost for a Thai Film. in: Kyoto Review of Southeast Asia (14)
- Baumann, Benjamin (2014) "From Filth-Ghost to Khmer-Witch: Phi Krasue’s Changing Cinematic Construction and its Symbolism", in: Horror Studies 5(2), pp. 183–196
- Baumann, Benjamin (2016) "The Khmer Witch Project: Demonizing the Khmer by Khmerizing a Demon", in: Bräunlein and Lauser (eds.) Ghost Movies in Southeast Asia and Beyond. Leiden: Brill. pp. 141–183
- Baumann, Benjamin. 2020. "Thai Monsters. Phi Krasue: Inhuman Kiss (Mogkolsiri, 2019)." In Monsters. A Companion, edited by Simon Bacon, 101–9. Oxford Peter Lang.
