= Khlong Ta Khot railway station =

Railway station in Khlong Ta Khot, Thailand

Coordinates: 13.7035°N 99.8524°E

Khlong Ta Khot คลองตาคต
- Station in 2025

General information
- Location: Mu 5 (Ban Khlong Ta Khot), Khlong Ta Khot Subdistrict, Photharam District, Ratchaburi
- Owner: State Railway of Thailand
- Line: Southern Line
- Platforms: 2
- Tracks: 2

Other information
- Station code: ตค.

Services
Preceding station	State Railway of Thailand	Following station
Nakhon Chum towards Hua Lamphong or Krung Thep Aphiwat	Southern Line	Photharam towards Su-ngai Kolok
Location

Khlong Ta Khot railway station is a railway station located in Khlong Ta Khot Subdistrict, Photharam District, Ratchaburi. It is a class 3 railway station located 77.290 km (48.0 mi) from Thon Buri railway station.

In 2024, the station was rebuilt as part of the double-track section from Nakhon Pathom - Chumphon. The new station featured elevated platforms and a new station building.

== Gallery ==
Station building in 2009

Old station in 2022 during the double-track construction
