= List of ghost films =

Ghost films can fall into a wide range of genres, including romance, comedy, horror, juvenile interest, and drama.

== History ==
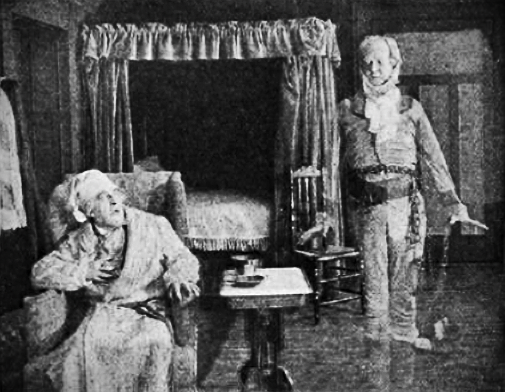
Marley's ghost in the 1916 film The Right to Be Happy

With the advent of motion pictures and television, screen depictions of ghosts became common and spanned a variety of genres; the works of Shakespeare, Charles Dickens and Oscar Wilde have all been made into cinematic versions.

Children's benevolent ghost stories became popular, such as Casper the Friendly Ghost, created in the 1930s and appearing in comics, animated cartoons, and eventually the 1995 feature film Casper. Noël Coward's play Blithe Spirit, later made into a film, places a more humorous slant on the phenomenon of haunting of individuals and specific locations, and The Ghost Goes West, a comedy in which a Scottish castle and its ghost are moved to Florida, was voted the best British film of 1935.

Sentimental depictions were more popular in early cinema than horror, and include the 1947 film The Ghost and Mrs. Muir, which was later adapted to television with a successful 1968–70 TV series. Genuine psychological horror films from this period include 1944's The Uninvited and 1945's Dead of Night.

The 1970s saw screen depictions of ghosts diverge into distinct genres of the romantic and horror. A common theme in the romantic genre from this period is the ghost as a benign guide or messenger, often with unfinished business, such as 1989's Field of Dreams, the 1990 film Ghost, and the 1993 comedy Heart and Souls. In the horror genre, 1980's The Fog, and the A Nightmare on Elm Street series of films from the 1980s and 1990s are notable examples of the trend for the merging of ghost stories with scenes of physical violence.

Popularised in such films as the 1984 comedy Ghostbusters, ghost hunting became a hobby for many who formed ghost hunting societies to explore reportedly haunted places. The ghost hunting theme has been featured in reality television series such as Ghost Adventures, Ghost Hunters, Ghost Hunters International, Most Haunted, and A Haunting. It is also represented in children's television by such programs as The Ghost Hunter and Ghost Trackers. Ghost hunting also gave rise to multiple guidebooks to haunted locations, and ghost hunting “how-to” manuals.

The 1990s saw a return to classic "gothic" ghosts, whose dangers were more psychological than physical. Examples of films from this period include 1999's The Sixth Sense and 2001's The Others.

Asian cinema has been adept at producing horror films about ghosts, such as the 1998 Japanese film Ring (remade in America as The Ring in 2002), and the Pang brothers' 2002 film The Eye.

== Films ==
Name	Year	Country, notes
100 Feet	2008	United States
13 B	2009	India
13 Ghosts	1960	United States
1408	2007	United States
2001 Maniacs	2005	United States
2001 Maniacs: Field of Screams	2010	United States
3 A.M.	2012	Thailand
303 Fear Faith Revenge	1998	Thailand
4bia	2008	Thailand
Aakasha Ganga	1999	India
Aakasha Ganga 2	2019	India
The Adventures of Ichabod and Mr. Toad	1949	United States
The Adventures of Mark Twain	1944	United States
After Death	1915	Russia
Alias Nick Beal	1949	United States
Aloha, Scooby-Doo!	2005	United States
Alone	2007	Thailand
Always	1989	United States
Always Be with You	2017	Hong Kong
The Amityville Horror	1979	United States
Anandabhadram	2005	India
The Ancestress	1919	Austria
And Now the Screaming Starts!	1973	United Kingdom
Ang Darling Kong Aswang	2009	Philippines
Ang Pagsanib kay Leah Dela Cruz	2017	Philippines
Annabelle	2014	United States
Annabelle Comes Home	2019	United States
Annabelle: Creation	2017	United States
Apartment 1303	2007	Japan
Apartment 1303 3D	2012	United States, Canada
Apartment 143	2012	Spain
Ape Yalu Punchi Boothaya	2010	Sri Lanka
Apthamitra	2004	India
Aranmanai	2014	India
Aranmanai 2	2016	India
Aranmanai 3	2021	India
Aranmanai 4	2024	India
Art of the Devil	2004	Thailand
Asso	1981	Italy
The Babadook	2014	Australia
Babang Luksa	2011	Philippines
Baby	2015	India
Bahubuthayo	2001	Sri Lanka
Bandhanaya	2017	Sri Lanka
Bangkok Haunted	2001	Thailand
Beetlejuice	1988	United States
Beetlejuice Beetlejuice	2024	United States
Before Dawn	1933	United States
The Beyond	1981	Italy
Beyond Tomorrow	1940	United States
Bhool Bhulaiyaa	2007	India
Bhoot	2003	India
Bhoothnath	2008	India
Bramayugam	2024	India
Blackbeard's Ghost	1968	United States
Blacker Than The Night	1975	Mexico
The Blair Witch Project	1999	United States
Blithe Spirit	1945	United Kingdom
Blithe Spirit	2020	United States
Bloody Crayons	2017	Philippines
Book of Blood	2009	United Kingdom
The Book of Life	2014	United States
Bride of Boogedy	1987	United States
Bulong	2011	Philippines
Bunshinsaba	2004	South Korea
Burnt Offerings	1976	United States
The Butterfly Effect 3: Revelations	2009	United States
Buy Now, Die Later	2015	Philippines
Candyman	1992	United States
The Canterville Ghost	1944	United States
The Canterville Ghost	1985	United States
The Canterville Ghost	1986	United States, United Kingdom
The Canterville Ghost	1996	United States
The Canterville Ghost	2023	United Kingdom
Carnival of Souls	1962	United States
Case 39	2009	United States
Casper	1995	For other Casper films, see Casper the Friendly Ghost filmography and Casper the Friendly Ghost in film.
Castle of Blood	1964	Italian-French; released in France as Danse Macabre and on American TV as Castle of Terror
The Cat and the Canary	1927	United States
The Cat and the Canary	1939	United States
Central Park	2017	United States
Chain Mail	2015	Philippines
Chamatkar	1992	India, uncredited remake of Blackbeard's Ghost
Chandramukhi	2005	India
The Changeling	1980	Canada
Chanthaly	2012	Laos
Chathur Mukham	2021	India
Chermin	2007	Malaysia
Child of Glass	1978	United States
A Chinese Ghost Story	1987	Hong Kong
Choose	2011	United States
A Christmas Carol	1908	United States. For many other adaptations, see this list.
A Christmas Carol	1938	United States
A Christmas Carol	1984	United States, United Kingdom
A Christmas Carol	1999	United States, United Kingdom
A Christmas Carol	2009	United States
Cinco	2010	Philippines
The Clock: Spirits Awakening	2019	Cambodia
The Cockeyed Miracle	1946	United States
Coco	2017	United States
Cold Case	2021	India
Conjurer	2008	United States
The Conjuring	2013	United States
The Conjuring 2	2016	United States
The Conjuring: The Devil Made Me Do It	2021	United States
Constantine	2005	United States
Coraline	2009	United States
Corazon: Ang Unang Aswang	2012	Philippines
Count Dracula	1970	Spain
Crazy with the Heat	1947	United States
Crimson Peak	2015	United States, Mexico, Canada
The Crow	1994	United States
Curse, Death & Spirit	1992	Japan
The Curse of the Cat People	1944	United States
The Curse of the Crying Woman	1961	Mexico
The Curse of El Charro	2005	United States
D' Anothers	2005	Philippines
Da One That Ghost Away	2018	Philippines
Da Possessed	2014	Philippines
Dalaw	2010	Philippines
The Dark	2005	UK, Germany
Dark Night of the Scarecrow	1981	United States
Dark Water	2002	Japan
Dark Water	2005	United States, Japan
Darkness	2002	United States, Spain
Darkness Falls	2003	United States, Australia
Darling	2015	India
Das Kleine Gespenst	2013	Germany, Switzerland
Dead Dudes in the House	1991	
Dead of Night	1945	United Kingdom
Dead Silence	2007	United States
Dead Talents Society	2024	Taiwan
Dearest Sister	2016	Laos
Death of a Ghost Hunter	2007	United States
Death on Demand	2008	United States
Death Ship	1980	Canada, United Kingdom
Dek hor	2006	Thailand
Dementia	2014	Philippines
Demonic Beauty	2002	Thailand
Demonte Colony	2015	India
Demonte Colony 2	2024	India
Der Kaiser von Kalifornien	1936	Germany
Destiny	1921	Germany
Devadoothan	2000	India
The Devil and Daniel Webster	1941	United States
The Devil's Backbone	2001	Spain
Diés Iraé	2025	India
Dilim	2014	Philippines
Doctor Sleep	2019	United States
Don't Look Up	1996	Japan
Dybbuk	2021	India, remake of Ezra (2017). Based on the Jewish dybbuk.
Earthbound	1940	United States
Ebenezer	2026	United States
Eeram	2009	India
The Echo	2008	United States
The Entity	1982	United States
Epitaph	2007	South Korean
Esprit d'amour	1983	Hong Kong
The Evil	1978	United States
The Eye	2002	Hong Kong
The Eye 2	2004	Hong Kong
The Eye 10	2005	Hong Kong
Ezra	2017	India
FeardotCom	2002	United States, United Kingdom, Germany, Luxembourg
Feng Shui	2004	Philippines
Feng Shui 2	2014	Philippines
Field of Dreams	1989	United States
Five Nights at Freddy's	2023	United States
The Flaming Crisis	1924	One of the earliest surviving Black-cast film posters depicting a ghost
The Fog	1980	United States
The Fog	2005	United States, Canada
Fragile	2005	Spain
Freddy's Dead: The Final Nightmare	1991	United States
The Frighteners	1996	United States, New Zealand
Full Circle	1977	Canada/United Kingdom
The Gallows	2015	United States
Geethaanjali	2013	India
Ghost	1990	United States
Ghost	2012	India
The Ghost and Mr. Chicken	1966	United States
The Ghost and Mrs. Muir	1947	United States
Ghost Banana Tree	2005	Cambodia
The Ghost Breakers	1940	United States
The Ghost Bride	2017	Philippines
Ghost Child	2013	Singapore
Ghost Dad	1990	United States
The Ghost Dance	1982	United States
Ghost Fever	1986	United States, Mexico
The Ghost Goes West	1935	United Kingdom
The Ghost Goes Wild	1947	United States
Ghost in the Machine	1993	United States
Ghost Lab	2021	Thailand
The Ghost of Frankenstein	1942	United States
The Ghost of St. Michael's	1941	United Kingdom
The Ghost of Yotsuya	1959	Japan
Ghost Rider	2007	United States
Ghost Ship	2002	Australia
Ghost Story	1981	United States
A Ghost Story	2017	United States
The Ghost Talks	1949	United States
Ghost Town	2008	United States
Ghost Town Anthology	2019	Canada: Répertoire des villes disparues
Ghost Train	1927	UK/Germany: Der Geisterzug
The Ghost Train	1941	United Kingdom
Ghostbusters	1984	United States
Ghostbusters: Afterlife	2021	United States. A sequel to the first two Ghostbusters films.
Ghostbusters: Answer the Call	2016	United States. A reboot of the Ghostbusters franchise from the 1980s.
Ghostbusters: Frozen Empire	2024	United States. A sequel to Ghostbusters: Afterlife.
Ghostbusters II	1989	United States. A sequel to the Ghostbusters movie from 1984.
Ghosts Can't Do It	1989	United States
The Ghosts of Berkeley Square	1947	United Kingdom
The Ghosts of Edendale	2003	United States
Ghosts of Girlfriends Past	2009	United States
Ghosts of Mars	2001	United States
Ghostwatch	1992	United Kingdom
The Gift	2000	United States
Gildersleeve's Ghost	1944	United States
Gindari	2015	Sri Lanka
The Gingerdead Man	2006	United States
Golpo Holeo Shotti	2014	India, Bengali remake of Tamil film Pizza
Gonjiam: Haunted Asylum	2018	South Korea
Gothika	2003	United States
Grave Encounters	2011	Canada, United States
Grave Encounters 2	2012	Canada, United States
Grave of the Fireflies	1988	Japan
Grave Secrets: The Legacy of Hilltop Drive	1992	United States
Grave Tales	2011	United Kingdom
The Gravedancers	2006	United States
The Great Ghost Rescue	2011	United Kingdom
The Grudge	2004	United States, Japan, Germany
The Grudge	2020	United States
The Grudge 2	2006	United States, Japan, Germany
The Grudge 3	2009	United States, Japan
Gunga Din	1939	United States
Guni-Guni	2012	Philippines
A Guy Named Joe	1943	United States
The Halfway House	1944	United Kingdom
Halik sa Hangin	2015	Philippines
Hallowed Ground	2007	United States
The Halloween Tree	1993	United States, Philippines
Hamlet	1948	British
Happy Ever After	1954	United Kingdom
Happy Land	1943	United States
Hasta el viento tiene miedo	1968	Mexico
Haunted	1995	United Kingdom
The Haunted Castle	1896	France
The Haunted Castle	1897	France
The Haunted Castle	1960	Germany
The Haunted Curiosity Shop	1901	United Kingdom
Haunted Forest	2017	Philippines
The Haunted House: The Dimensional Goblin and the Seven Worlds	2022	South Korea
The Haunted House: The Secret of the Cave	2018	South Korea
The Haunted House: The Sky Goblin VS Jormungandr	2019	South Korea
Haunted Lighthouse	2003	United States
Haunted Mansion	2015	Philippines
Haunted Mansion	2023	United States, based on the Disneyland ride with the same name
The Haunted Mansion	2003	United States, based on the Disneyland ride with the same name
The Haunted Palace	1963	United Kingdom
The Haunting	1963	United States, United Kingdom
The Haunting	1999	United States
The Haunting in Connecticut	2009	United States, Canada
A Haunting in Georgia	2002	United States
A-Haunting We Will Go	1942	United States
The Headless Horseman	1922	United States
The Healing	2012	Philippines
Heart and Souls	1993	United States
Heavenly Daze	1948	United States
Here Comes Mr. Jordan	1941	United States
Hide and Seek	2007	Philippines
High Spirits	1988	United States, United Kingdom
Hold That Ghost	1941	United States
House	1977	Japan
House	1986	United States
House II: The Second Story	1987	United States
The House of Ghosts	1908	France (La maison ensorcelée)
House on Haunted Hill	1959	United States
House on Haunted Hill	1999	United States
The House That Would Not Die	1970	United States
The House Where Evil Dwells	1982	United States, Japan
Housebound	2014	New Zealand
How High	2001	United States
Hum Kaun Hai?	2004	India
Hunting Matthew Nichols	2024	Canada
Hysterical	1983	United States
I Am Frankelda	2025	Mexico
I Am the Pretty Thing That Lives in the House	2016	United States, Canada
I Love You to Death	2016	Philippines
Ilawod	2017	Philippines
The Innkeepers	2011	United States
The Innocents	1961	United Kingdom
Insidious	2011	United States
Insidious: Chapter 2	2013	United States
Insidious: Chapter 3	2015	United States
Insidious: The Last Key	2018	United States
An Inspector Calls	1954	United Kingdom
Into the Mirror	2003	South Korea
The Iron Mask	1929	United States
It Happened Tomorrow	1944	United States
Jack Brooks: Monster Slayer	2007	Canada
Jack-O	1995	United States
Jangan Pandang Belakang	2007	Malaysia
Jekhane Bhooter Bhoy	2012	India
Jessabelle	2014	United States
Jolly Roger: Massacre at Cutter's Cove	2005	United States
Ju-on: The Grudge	2003	Japan
Jug Face	2013	United States
Jwanita	2015	Malaysia, abbreviation for "Jiwa Wanita"; English: Women Heart
Kairo	2001	Japan
Kalpana	2012	India
Kamara Kattu	2015	India
Kanchana 2	2015	India
Kilometer 31	2006	Mexico
Kimmy Dora and the Temple of Kiyeme	2012	Philippines
Krasue Valentine	2006	Thailand
Kung Fu Ghost	2022	United States
Kuroneko	1968	Japan
Kutob	2005	Philippines
Kwaidan	1964	Japan
La Llorona	1960	Mexico
Lady in White	1988	United States
Lake Mungo	2008	Australia
Lani Loa - The Passage	1998	United States, China
Laurin	1989	Germany, Hungary
Laxmii	2020	India
The Lazarus Effect	2015	United States
The Legend of Hell House	1973	United Kingdom
The Legend of Sleepy Hollow	1980	United States
Lego Scooby-Doo! Haunted Hollywood	2016	
Little Murder	2011	
The Live Ghost	1934	
Lonesome Ghosts	1937	
The Lovely Bones	2009	
Madhumati	1958	India
Mag-ingat Ka Sa... Kulam	2008	Philippines
The Maid	2005	Singapore
Mama	2013	
The Man in the Iron Mask	1939	
Mang Kepweng: Ang Lihim ng Bandanang Itim	2020	Philippines
Mang Kepweng Returns	2017	Philippines
Manichitrathazhu	1993	India
Maria Leonora Teresa	2014	Philippines - Star Cinema Film
Marry My Dead Body	2023	Taiwan
Massu Engira Masilamani	2015	India
Maxie	1985	
May	2002	
Maya	2015	India
Maya 3D	2016	Sri Lanka
The Messengers	2007	
Mirrors	2008	
Mirrors 2	2010	United States
The Miser's Doom	1899	United Kingdom
The Mommy Returns	2012	Philippines
Mostly Ghostly	2008	
Mostly Ghostly: Have You Met My Ghoulfriend?	2014	
Mostly Ghostly: One Night in Doom House	2016	
The Moth Diaries	2011	Canada, Ireland
Mr. Boogedy	1986	United States
Mulberry Street	2006	United States
Munafik	2016	Malaysia
Muni	2007	India
Muni 2: Kanchana	2011	India
Muni 3	2015	India
The Muppet Christmas Carol	1992	
Nang Nak	1999	Thailand
Neel Kamal	1968	India
The New Daughter	2009	
Night of Dark Shadows	1971	United States
Night of the Scarecrow	1995	
Night on the Galactic Railroad	1985	Japan
The Nightmare Before Christmas	1993	
A Nightmare on Elm Street	1984	United States
A Nightmare on Elm Street	2010	United States
A Nightmare on Elm Street 2: Freddy's Revenge	1985	United States
A Nightmare on Elm Street 3: Dream Warriors	1987	United States
A Nightmare on Elm Street 4: The Dream Master	1988	United States
A Nightmare on Elm Street 5: The Dream Child	1989	United States
Nomads	1986	
Oculus	2013	
Old Mother Riley's Ghosts	1941	United Kingdom
Om Shanti Om	2007	India
The Orphanage	2007	Spain
The Other	1972	
The Other Side of the Tracks	2008	
The Others	2001	United States, Spain, France, Italy
Ouija	2007	Philippines
Ouija	2014	United States
Ouija: Origin of Evil	2016	United States
Over Her Dead Body	2008	
Paranormal Activity	2007	United States
Paranormal Activity 2	2010	United States
Paranormal Activity 3	2011	United States
Paranormal Activity 4	2012	United States
Paranormal Activity: The Ghost Dimension	2015	United States
Paranormal Activity: The Marked Ones	2014	United States
Paranormal Activity: Next of Kin	2021	United States
ParaNorman	2012	
Patayin sa Sindak si Barbara	1995	Philippines
Patient X	2009	Philippines
Pee Mak	2013	Thailand
Pet Sematary	1989	United States
The Phantom Carriage	1921	Sweden
The Phantom President	1932	
Phobia 2	2009	Thailand
Photographing a Ghost	1898	United Kingdom
Pirates of the Caribbean: The Curse of the Black Pearl	2003	United States
Pisaj	2004	Thailand
Pizza	2012	India
Poltergeist	1982	
Poltergeist	2015	
Poltergeist II	1986	
Poltergeist III	1988	
Pontianak Harum Sundal Malam	2004	Malaysia
Pontianak Harum Sundal Malam 2	2005	Malaysia
Practical Magic	1998	United States
Prema Katha Chitram	2013	India
Presence of Mind	1999	Spain, United States
Pridyider	2012	Philippines
Prison	1987	United States
Pulse	2006	United States
Pulse 2: Afterlife	2008	United States
Pulse 3	2008	United States
The Pumpkin Karver	2006	
Pwera Usog	2017	Philippines
R-Point	2004	South Korea
R.I.P.D.	2013	
Raiders of the Lost Ark	1981	
Rajmohol	2005	India
Ran Kevita	2007	Sri Lanka
Ran Kevita 2	2013	Sri Lanka
The Red Shoes	2005	South Korea
The Remarkable Andrew	1942	
Retribution	2006	Japan
Return to House on Haunted Hill	2007	
Riding the Bullet	2004	United States, Germany, Canada
Ring	1998	Japan
The Ring	2002	United States
Ring 2	1999	Japan
The Ring Two	2005	United States
Rings	2017	United States
Rinne	2006	Japan
The Rite	2011	
Romancham	2023	India
Rouge	1988	Hong Kong
Route 666	2001	Canada, United States
Saint Ange	2004	France
Scalps	1983	
Scarecrow	2002	
Scared Stiff	1953	
Scary Movie	2000	
Scary Movie 2	2001	
Scary Movie 3	2003	
Scary Movie 4	2006	
Scary Movie 5	2013	
Schalcken the Painter	1979	United Kingdom
School Spirit	1985	
Scooby-Doo	2002	
Scooby-Doo 2: Monsters Unleashed	2004	United States, Canada
Scooby-Doo! and the Goblin King	2008	
Scooby-Doo! and the Legend of the Vampire	2003	
Scooby-Doo! and the Loch Ness Monster	2004	
Scooby-Doo! and the Witch's Ghost	1999	
Scooby-Doo! Camp Scare	2010	
Scooby-Doo! Curse of the Lake Monster	2010	
Scooby-Doo! Frankencreepy	2014	
Scooby-Doo! Music of the Vampire	2012	
Scooby-Doo! The Mystery Begins	2009	
Scooby-Doo! Stage Fright	2013	
Scordato	2023	Italy
The Scream Team	2002	
The Screaming Skull	1958	
Scrooge	1935	United Kingdom
Scrooge	1951	United Kingdom
Scrooge	1970	United Kingdom
Scrooged	1988	
Segunda Mano	2011	Philippines
Seklusyon	2016	Philippines
The Sentinel	1977	
Shake, Rattle & Roll	1984	Philippines
Shake, Rattle & Roll II	1990	Philippines
Shake, Rattle & Roll 2k5	2005	Philippines
Shake, Rattle & Roll III	1991	Philippines
Shake, Rattle & Roll IV	1992	Philippines
Shake, Rattle & Roll V	1994	Philippines
Shake, Rattle & Roll VI	1997	Philippines
Shake, Rattle and Roll 8	2006	Philippines
Shake, Rattle and Roll 9	2007	Philippines
Shake, Rattle & Roll X	2008	Philippines
Shake, Rattle & Roll XI	2009	Philippines
Shake, Rattle and Roll 12	2010	Philippines
Shake, Rattle & Roll 13	2011	Philippines
Shake, Rattle and Roll Fourteen: The Invasion	2012	Philippines
Shake, Rattle & Roll XV	2014	Philippines
Shake, Rattle & Roll Evil Origins	2025	Philippines
Shake, Rattle & Roll Extreme	2023	Philippines
The Shining	1980	United Kingdom, United States
Shock	2004	India
Shutter	2004	Thailand
Shutter	2008	United States
Sigaw	2005	Philippines
Silent Tongue	1993	United States, United Kingdom, France, Netherlands
Sinister	2012	United States
Sinister 2	2015	United States
The Sixth Man	1997	
The Sixth Sense	1999	United States
Sledgehammer	1983	
Sleepy Hollow	1999	
Smilin' Through	1932	
Smilin' Through	1941	
The Smiling Ghost	1941	
Someone Behind You	2007	South Korea
Soul	2020	United States
The Spirit Is Willing	1967	United States
Spirit of the Glass	2004	Philippines
Spirit Warriors	2000	Philippines
Spirit Warriors: The Shortcut	2002	Philippines
The St. Francisville Experiment	2000	United States
Stardust	2007	
Stay Alive	2006	
Stir of Echoes	1999	
Stir of Echoes: The Homecoming	2007	
Stitches	2012	Ireland
Strawberry	2015	India
Sukob	2006	Philippines
Sundo	2009	Philippines
Supernatural	1933	
Susie Q	1996	
Susuk	2008	Malaysia
T2	2009	Philippines
Tales of Halloween	2015	United States
Tales of Terror	1962	
The Terror	1963	
That Lady in Ermine	1948	
That's the Spirit	1945	
Third Eye	2014	Philippines
Thirteen Ghosts	2001	United States
Three	2002	Hong Kong
Tigers Are Not Afraid	2017	Mexico
The Time of Their Lives	1946	United States
Tiyanaks	2007	Philippines
The Tomb of Ligeia	1964	United Kingdom
The Tooth Fairy	2006	United States
Topper	1937	United States
Topper Returns	1941	United States
Topper Takes a Trip	1938	United States
Tormented	1960	United States
Tormented	2009	United Kingdom
Tower of Terror	1997	United States, based on the Walt Disney World attraction The Twilight Zone Tower of Terror
Tragic Theater	2015	Philippines
Trick or Treat	1986	United States
Trilogy of Terror	1975	United States
Troublesome Night	1997	Hong Kong
Troublesome Night 2	1997	Hong Kong
Troublesome Night 3	1998	Hong Kong
Troublesome Night 4	1998	Hong Kong, Philippines
Troublesome Night 5	1999	Hong Kong
Troublesome Night 6	1999	Hong Kong
Troublesome Night 7	2000	Hong Kong
Troublesome Night 8	2000	Hong Kong
Troublesome Night 9	2001	Hong Kong
Troublesome Night 10	2001	Hong Kong
Troublesome Night 11	2001	Hong Kong
Troublesome Night 12	2001	Hong Kong
Troublesome Night 13	2002	Hong Kong
Troublesome Night 14	2002	Hong Kong
Troublesome Night 15	2002	Hong Kong
Troublesome Night 16	2002	Hong Kong
Troublesome Night 17	2002	Hong Kong
Troublesome Night 18	2003	Hong Kong
Troublesome Night 19	2003	Hong Kong
Truly, Madly, Deeply	1990	United Kingdom
Tumbok	2011	Philippines
Two Thousand Maniacs!	1964	United States
Ugetsu	1953	Japan
Uncle Boonmee who can recall his past lives	2010	Thailand
Undead	2003	Australia
The Unearthing	2015	United States
Unfriended	2014	United States
The Uninvited	1944	United States
V/H/S	2012	United States
V/H/S/2	2013	United States
V/H/S/85	2023	United States
V/H/S/94	2021	United States
V/H/S/99	2022	United States
V/H/S/Beyond	2024	United States
V/H/S/Halloween	2025	United States
V/H/S/Mixtape	2026	United States
V/H/S: Viral	2014	United States
Vazhiye	2021	India
Villa Estrella	2009	Philippines
Wag Kang Lilingon	2006	Philippines
We Are Still Here	2015	United States
Web of the Spider	1970	Italy; remake of Castle of Blood
Wes Craven's New Nightmare	1994	United States
What Lies Beneath	2000	United States
Where Got Ghost?	2009	Singapore
White House	2010	Philippines
White Lady	2006	Philippines
White Noise	2005	Canada, United Kingdom, United States
White Noise: The Light	2007	United States, Canada
Wind Chill	2007	United Kingdom, United States
Witchboard	1986	United States
Witchboard 2: The Devil's Doorway	1993	United States
Witchouse	1999	United States
The Woman in Black	1989	United Kingdom
The Woman in Black	2012	United Kingdom
The Woman in Black: Angel of Death	2014	United Kingdom
Wonder Man	1945	United States
The Wraith	1986	United States
Yaamirukka Bayamey	2014	India
Yotsuya Kaidan	1956	Japan
Zombi Kampung Pisang	2008	Malaysia, horror comedy
Zoom	2016	Sri Lanka

== Television series ==
=== Dramas and comedies ===
- 1953–1955: Topper
- 1955–1965: Alfred Hitchcock Presents
- 1959–1961: One Step Beyond
- 1959–1964: The Twilight Zone
- 1968–1970: The Ghost and Mrs. Muir
- 1969–1971: Randall and Hopkirk (Deceased)
- 1971–1978, 2005– : A Ghost Story for Christmas
- 1975: The Ghost Busters
- 1976–1984: Rentaghost
- 1976–1978: The Ghosts of Motley Hall
- 1978: The Clifton House Mystery
- 1985–1989: Alfred Hitchcock Presents
- 1985–1989: The Twilight Zone
- 1986–1991: The Real GhostBusters
- 1987: Second Chance
- 1989–1996: Tales from the Crypt
- 1990: Elly & Jools
- 1990–1991: Shades of L.A.
- 1992–1994: So Haunt Me
- 1993–1997: Zee Horror Show
- 1994-2018: The X-Files
- 1994–1997: The Kingdom
- 1995–2015: Aahat
- 1997–1998: Ghost Stories (episode list)
- 1997: The Shining
- 1999: Polterguests
- 1999–2002: Providence
- 2000: The Others
- 2000–2001: Randall & Hopkirk (Deceased)
- 2001: All Souls
- 2001–2010: Ssshhhh...Koi Hai
- 2001-2005: Six Feet Under
- 2002: Haunted
- 2002–2003: The Twilight Zone
- 2004: Kingdom Hospital
- 2004–2005: Hex
- 2004-2011: Rescue Me
- 2004–2011: Medium
- 2005–2010: Ghost Whisperer
- 2005–2020: Supernatural
- 2007: The Dresden Files
- 2008–2013: Being Human
- 2010: Dead Gorgeous
- 2011: American Horror Story: Murder House
- 2011: Becoming Human
- 2011: Bedlam
- 2011: The Fades
- 2011: Bag of Bones
- 2011–2012: A Gifted Man
- 2011–2014: Being Human
- 2012–2017: Saving Hope
- 2013–2015: The Haunted Hathaways (episodes)
- 2013–2017: Sleepy Hollow
- 2015–2016: Puli
- 2015–2021: The Magicians
- 2015–2016: American Horror Story: Hotel
- 2016: American Horror Story: Roanoke
- 2016: The Living and the Dead
- 2018: The Haunting of Hill House
- 2018-2020: Chilling Adventures of Sabrina
- 2018–2022: Wellington Paranormal
- 2019–2023: Ghosts
- 2019: The InBetween
- 2020: Julie and the Phantoms
- 2023: Lockwood and Co

=== Animation ===
- 1963–1969: The New Casper Cartoon Show
- 1969–1978: Scooby-Doo, Where Are You!
- 1971–1972: The Funky Phantom
- 1979: Casper and the Angels
- 1985–1986: The 13 Ghosts of Scooby-Doo
- 1986: Ghostbusters
- 1986–1991: The Real Ghostbusters
- 1989–1991: Beetlejuice
- 1991–1992: Little Ghosts, There, Here, and Where
- 1993–1994: Ghost Sweeper Mikami
- 1996–1997: Extreme Ghostbusters
- 1996–1998: The Spooktacular New Adventures of Casper
- 1999–2002: Courage the Cowardly Dog
- 2000–2001: Ghost stories in school
- 2004–2007: Danny Phantom
- 2009–2012: Casper's Scare School
- 2010–2013: Scooby-Doo! Mystery Incorporated
- 2012–2016: Gravity Falls
- 2013: Dude, That's My Ghost!
- 2015: Lego Ninjago: Masters of Spinjitzu
- 2016-present: The Haunted House
- 2017-2021: DuckTales
- 2018-2021: Vampirina
- 2021–2024: The Ghost and Molly McGee
- 2021: Frankelda's Book of Spooks
- 2025: Haunted Hotel

=== Puppets ===
- 1989: The Ghost of Faffner Hall

=== Ghost reality shows ===
- 1996–1997: Ghosthunters
- 1998–2001: Haunted History
- 2000–2006: Scariest Places on Earth
- 2002–present: Most Haunted
- 2004–2016: Ghost Hunters
- 2005–2011: Ghostly Encounters
- 2005–2006: Ghost Hunt
- 2006: Extreme Ghost Stories
- 2007–2011: Paranormal State
- 2008–present: Ghost Adventures
- 2008–2012: Ghost Hunters International
- 2009–2014: Celebrity Ghost Stories
- 2009-2010: I Believe in Ghosts: Joe Swash
- 2009–2010: Ghost Hunters Academy
- 2009–2011: Ghost Lab
- 2009–2010: Ghost Stories
- 2009–2010: Most Terrifying Places in America
- 2010–2013: My Ghost Story
- 2011: Paranormal Challenge
- 2011–present: The Dead Files
- 2011–2016: Paranormal Witness
- 2012: Haunted Encounters
- 2005–2007; 2012–2019: A Haunting

== See also ==
- Ghost stories
- Indian ghost movies
- Vengeful ghost films
- Casper the Friendly Ghost in film
- List of ghosts
