= Photharam railway station =

Railway station in Thailand

Coordinates: 13.6937°N 99.8506°E

Photharam โพธาราม
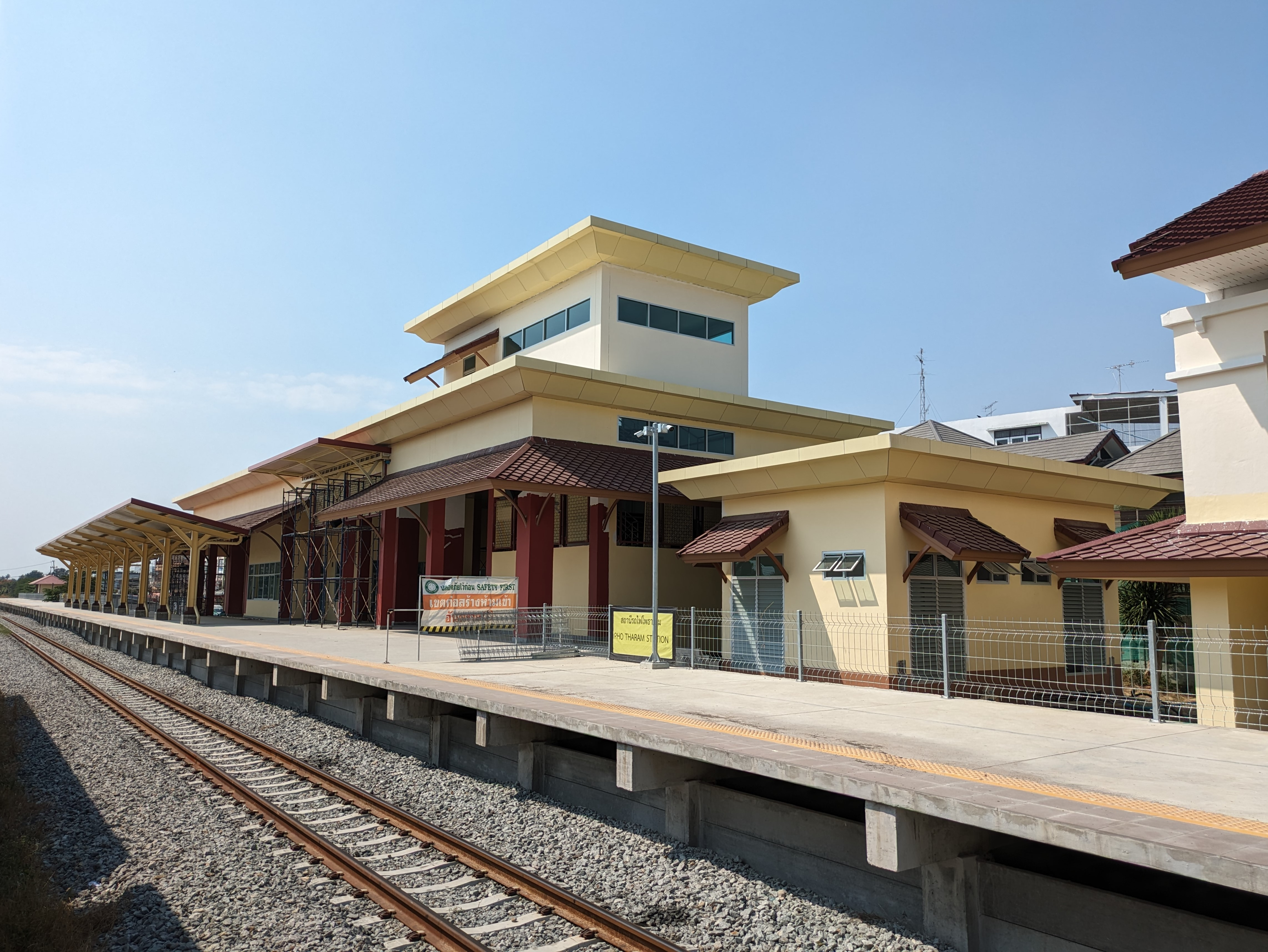
- New station building in 2024

General information
- Location: Photharam Road, Photharam Subdistrict, Photharam District, Ratchaburi
- Owner: State Railway of Thailand
- Line: Southern Line
- Platforms: 2
- Tracks: 4

Other information
- Station code: พร.

Services
Preceding station	State Railway of Thailand	Following station
Khlong Ta Khot towards Hua Lamphong or Krung Thep Aphiwat	Southern Line	Chet Samian towards Su-ngai Kolok
Location

Photharam railway station is a railway station located in Photharam Subdistrict, Photharam District, Ratchaburi. It is a class 2 railway station and the main station for Photharam district, located 81.804 km (50.8 mi) from Thon Buri railway station.

In 2024, the station was rebuilt as part of the double-track section from Nakhon Pathom - Chumphon, featuring elevated platforms and a new station building.

== Gallery ==
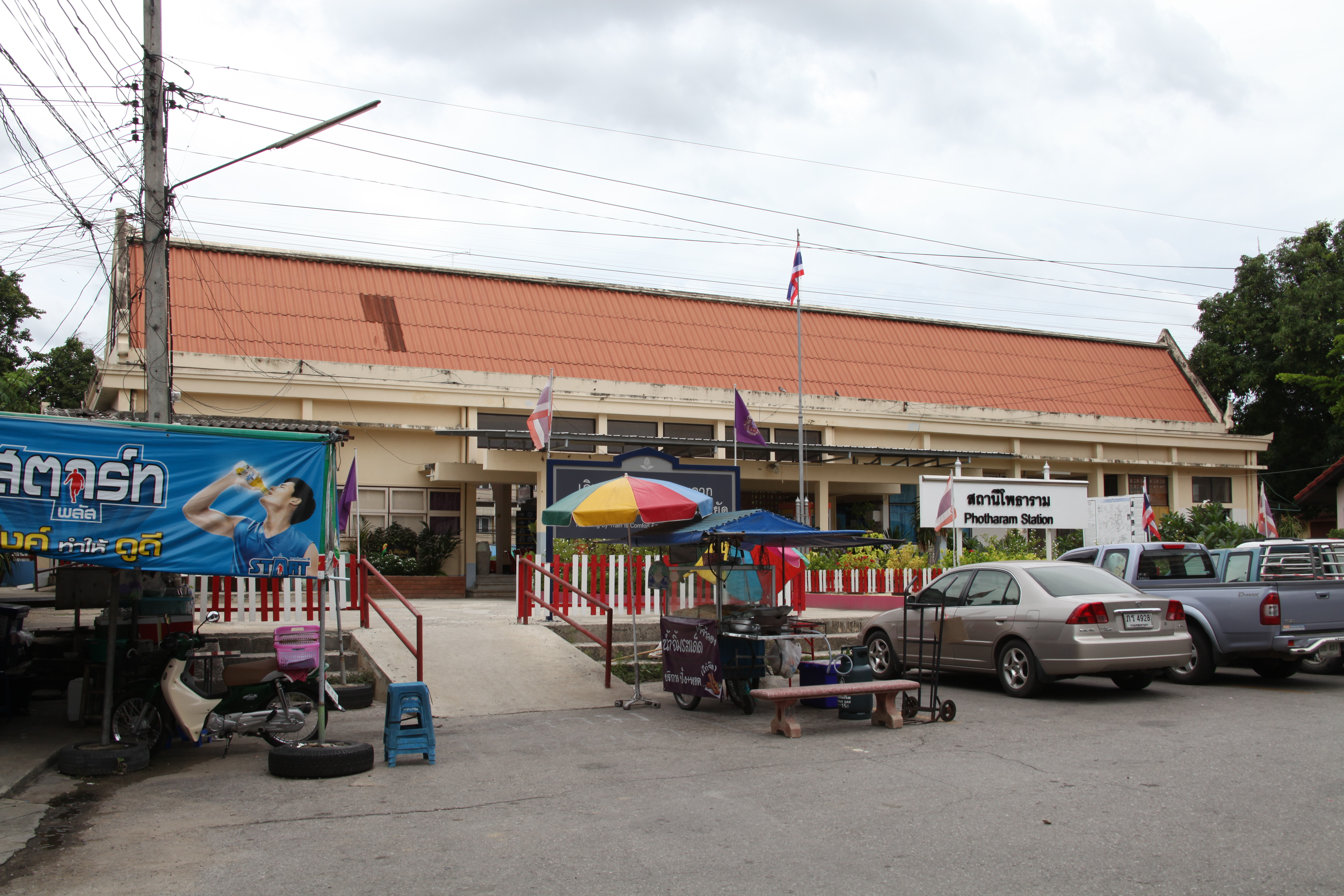
The second-generation station building. Used from the late 60s to 2020

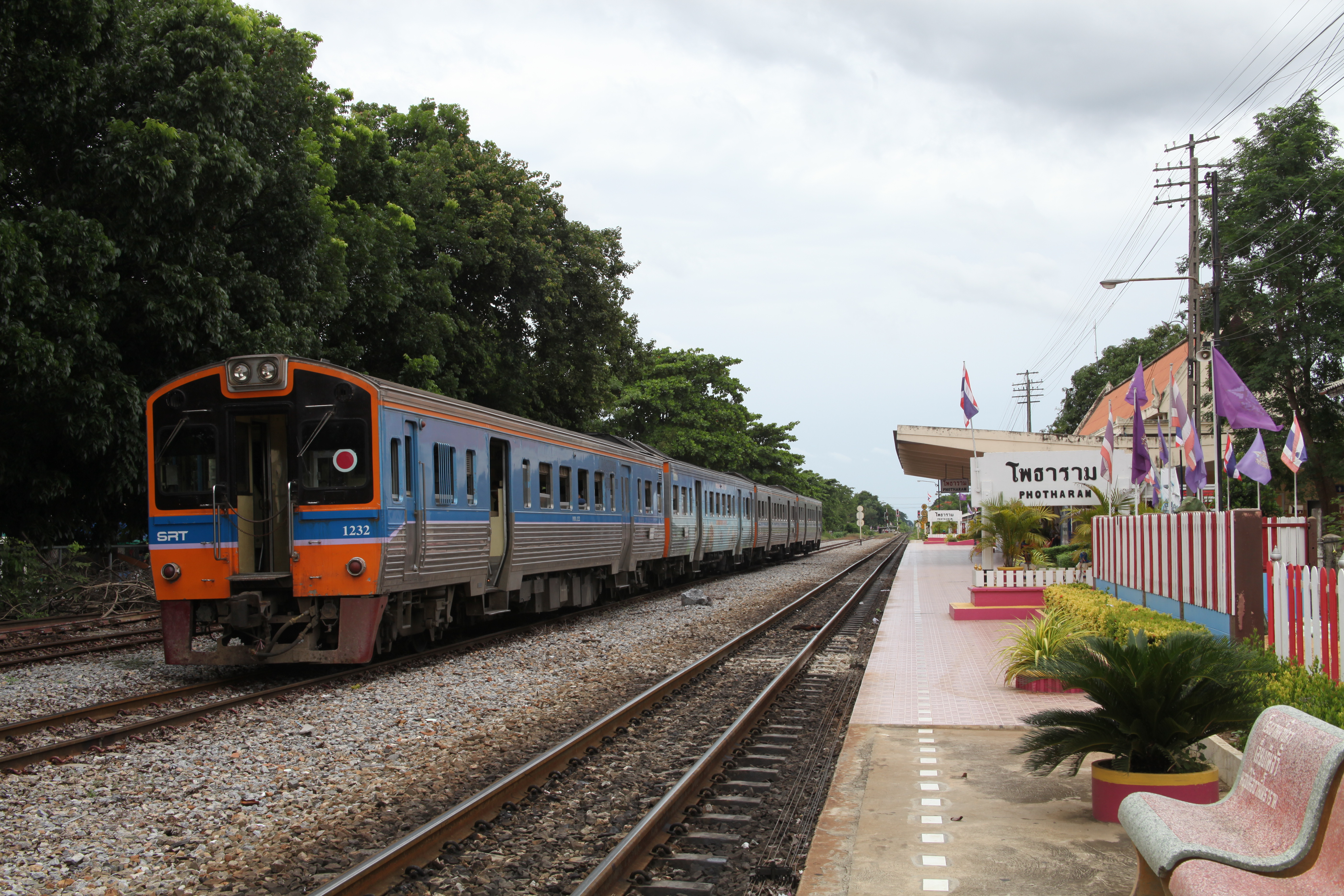
Station in 2015

Temporary station
