= Chet Samian =

Sub-district in Ratchaburi Province, Thailand

Coordinates: 13.626417°N 99.829361°E

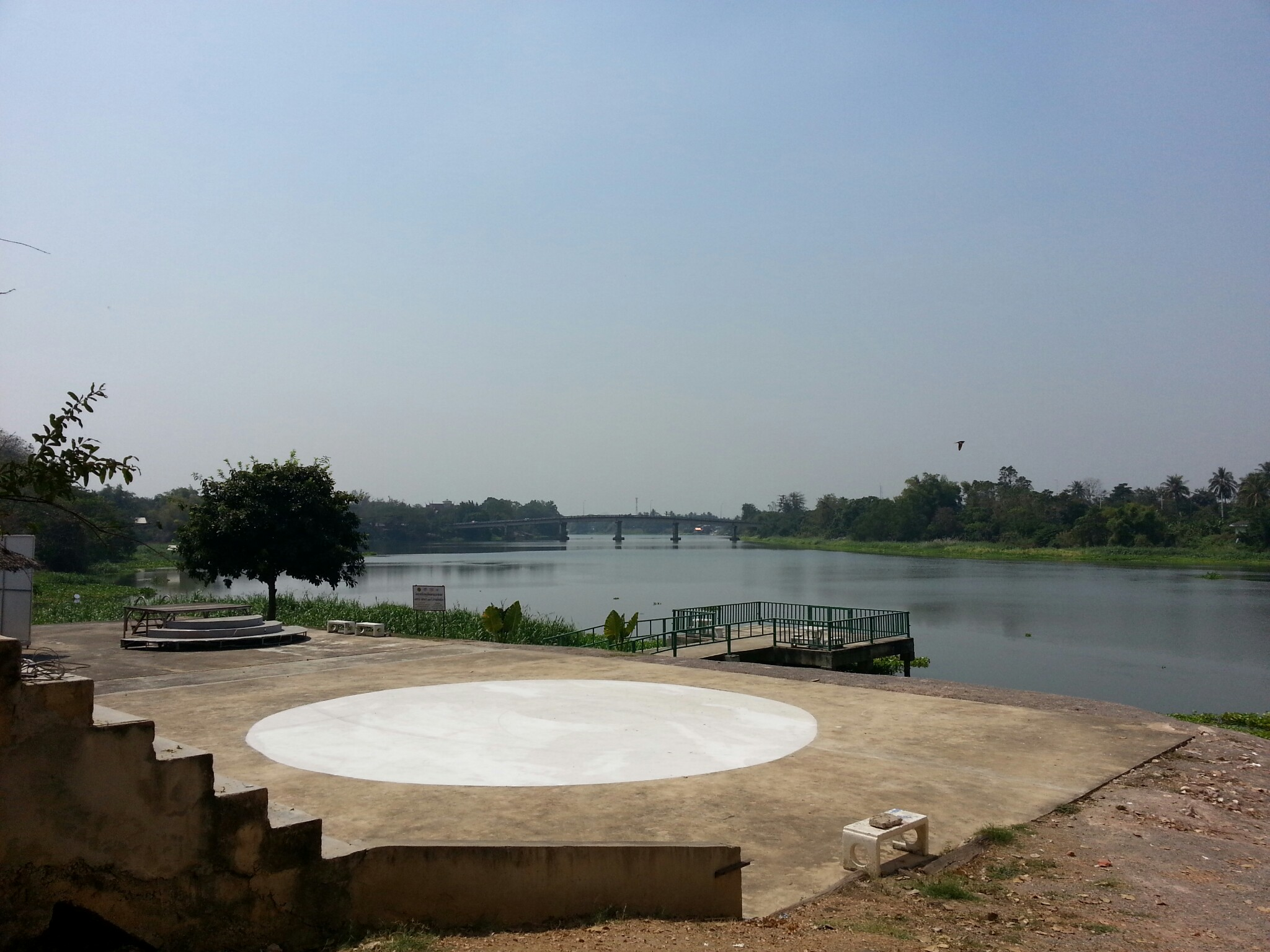
An exercise plaza of Chet Samian by Mae Klong River

Chet Samian (Thai: เจ็ดเสมียน, pronounced [t͡ɕèt sā.mǐa̯n]) is a tambon (sub-district) of Photharam District, Ratchaburi Province, western Thailand.

== History ==
Its name "Chet Samian" literally translated as "seven clerks" or "seven scribes". According to its folklore that in the King Taksin's reign, when he had traveled here and wanted to recruit local young men who would volunteer as draftees to fight with the Burmese army. However, the clerk who followed him didn't keep up with his work. Therefore, the recruitment of literate people to act as clerks was announced instead. There were a total of seven volunteers, all of whom performed their duties very well and impressed the King.

Another version is similar, but it is an event that happened in the King Chulalongkorn (Rama V)'s reign, which coincides with the middle Rattanakosin period. It is said that the military conscription is the same. The official clerk was unable to work in time. Therefore, literate seven villagers had to be recruited to act in their place as well.

In the past, when the tide was low, the beaches of the Mae Klong River were clearly visible. A wide variety of shellfish buried in the sand will emerge, such as freshwater clams and freshwater basket clams, are caught and cooked as a local delicacy.

Sub-district Municipality Chet Samian was established in 2004 by merging the Sub-district Administrative Organization (TAO) Chet Samian with some parts of the Sub-district Municipality Chet Samian.

Nowadays, the condition of houses that are hundreds of years old wooden shophouses, including the community market, are still operating as they were in the past.

== Geography ==
Chet Samian is a small and quiet county on the Mae Klong River that flows from adjacent province Kanchanaburi. It is situated away from Mueang Ratchaburi District, a province of Ratchaburi's capital about 13 km (8.1 mi) and about 7 km (4.3 mi) south of downtown Photharam.

The area bounded by other areas (from north clockwise): Khlong Khoi in its district, Don Sai in its district, Sam Ruean and Tha Rap in Mueang Ratchaburi District, and Khlong Khoi in its district.

== Demography ==
The local population consists of Thai people of various ethnicities, such as Laotian, Khmer, Chinese. The ancestors of those with Khmer descent migrated from Surin, while the ancestors of those with Lao descent migrated from Kingdom of Vientiane.

Until today, the way of life of the people of Chet Samian is still the same as in the past. Chinese takuan is a local good stuff.

== Administration ==
The entire area of Chet Samian is governed by the Sub-district Municipality Chet Samian (เทศบาลตำบลเจ็ดเสมียน).

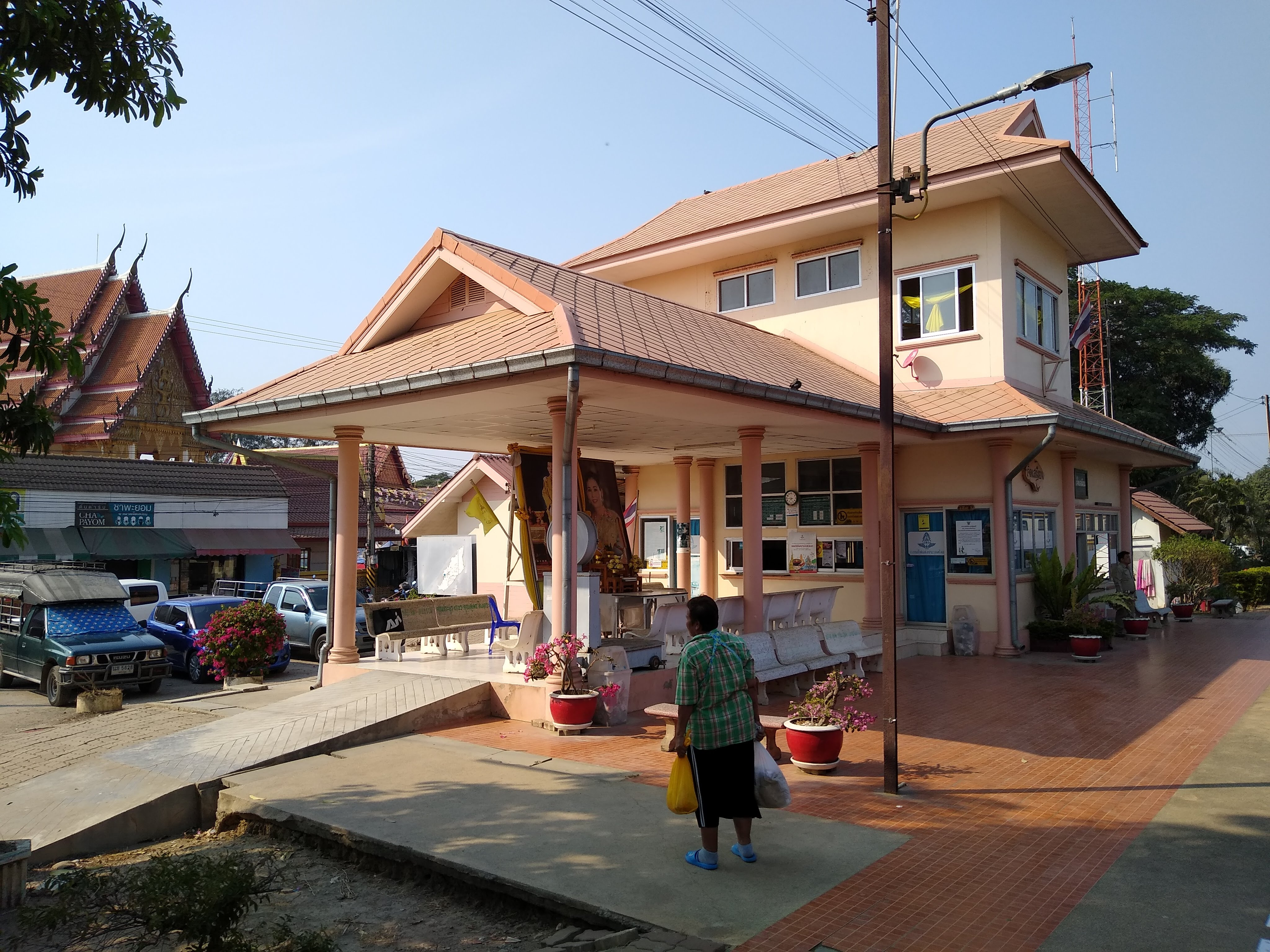
Chet Samian Railway Station

The area also consists of six administrative mubans (village).

No.	Name	Thai
1.	Ban Wang Luek	บ้านวังลึก
2.	Ban Ko Somboon	บ้านเกาะสมบูรณ์
3.	Ban Chet Samian	บ้านเจ็ดเสมียน
4.	Ban Sanam Chai	บ้านสนามชัย
5.	Ban Khlong Makham	บ้านคลองมะขาม
6.	Ban Don Mai Riang	บ้านดอนไม้เรียง

== Transportation ==
Chet Samian is served by the Chet Samian Railway Station of the State Railway of Thailand (SRT), whose Southern Line runs through the area.
