= Ghost Stories (1997 TV series) =

- DVD cover
- Genre: Horror; Mystery; Anthology; Drama
- Narrated by: Rip Torn
- Composer: Claude Foisy
- Country of origin: United States
- Original language: English
- No. of seasons: 1
- No. of episodes: 44 (list of episodes)

Production
- Executive producers: Frederick Rappaport; Tom Naughton; Nicolas Valcour
- Production companies: New Dominion Pictures; All American Television

Original release
- Network: The Family Channel
- Release: September 28, 1997 – June 8, 1998

Ghost Stories is an American horror anthology television series that ran from 1997 to 1998 on The Family Channel.

The show was narrated by Rip Torn and originally two episodes were presented back to back in an hour-long segment. However, towards the end of the series, it was broken down into 30 minute episodes with just one story, most featuring a style similar to episodes of The Twilight Zone in which there would be a twist at the end.

There have been five DVD releases. Also, Ghost Stories was shown in the United Kingdom on ITV and, more recently, the TV channel Zone Horror.

== Episodes ==
Each episode begins with an introduction segment narrated by Rip Torn (viewable in QuickTime or in Windows Media):

Come with me to a place of wondrous contradictions. A place that is silent and unstirring yet restless and alive. A place of untold peace and boundless dread. Come with me into the very cradle of darkness, where those who dwell, dwell alone.

Once complete, it goes directly into the episode where Rip Torn introduces the episode. During the episode's conclusion, Rip Torn comments on what was seen (usually in some form of a moral).

== Home releases ==
=== Volume sets ===
Name	Release date	Ep #	Additional information
Ghost Stories	December 7, 2004	40	5-disc DVD set released by Platinum Disc Corporation, presented in a digipak format with no bonus features or commentary; excludes 4 episodes; "It's Only A Movie", "At Death's Door", "Going Down", and "Cabin Fever".
Ghost Stories: Volume 1	August 23, 2005	8	Run-time of 165 minutes and is basically a repackaged version of disc 1 from the box set above; followed by Ghost Stories, Vol. 2, which is disc 2 from the box set above.
Ghost Stories: 6-disc set	September 30, 2008	44	The complete series was released in a 6-disc set, including the 4 never-before-seen episodes; comes in a new digipack with the same 5 volumes and a 6th disc including the 4 never-before-released episodes; released on region 1 with no other bonus features.
Haunted: Ghost Stories	October 6, 2009	40	The 40-episode set was re-released in a 2-disc keepcase featuring new cover art and bearing the title: Haunted: Ghost Stories; each disc is dual-sided and contains 10 episodes of the series as opposed to 8; presented in a standard DVD case and includes no bonus features.
Ghost Stories – The Complete Series	April 10, 2012	44	The complete series was re-released in a 4-disc set by Timeless Media Group.

=== Complete set ===
On September 30, 2008, the complete series was released in a 6-disc set, including the 4 never-before-seen episodes. The set comes in a new digipack with the same 5 volumes and a 6th disc including the 4 never-before released episodes. It was released on region 1 with no other bonus features.

This set includes the episodes shown below and does not have any special features or commentary.

==== Disc 1 ====
- Cold In The Grave
- Landscape Of Lost Dreams
- Personal Demons
- You'll Wake The Dead
- Mirror, Mirror
- You'll Always Be Mine
- Back Ward
- Beware The Muse

==== Disc 2 ====
- The Stainless Blade
- Wake In Fear
- Last Flight Out
- Resting Place
- Step-Sister
- All Night Diner
- Beat The Reaper
- Green-Eyed Monster

==== Disc 3 ====
- Blood Money
- Cold Dark Space
- Sara's Friends
- I Heard You Call My Name
- Conscience
- Bless Me Father
- Fatal Distraction
- Sleep No More

==== Disc 4 ====
- Cloistered
- The House That Spilled Tears
- Blazes
- The New Nanny
- Underground
- Point Hope
- The Scream House
- State Of Grace

==== Disc 5 ====
- Heartsick
- From The Ashes
- Winner Take All
- Inheritance
- Denial
- Erased
- Parting Shot
- Consumers

==== Disc 6 ====
- It's Only A Movie
- At Death's Door
- Going Down
- Cabin Fever

==== Technical data ====
- Region: Region 1
- Aspect Ratio: 1.33:1
- Rating: PG-13
- Run Time: 910 minutes
- UPC: 096009576899

== See also ==
- List of Ghost Stories episodes
- List of ghost films

=== Similar shows ===
- Perversions of Science
- Tales from the Crypt
- Tales from the Darkside
- The Twilight Zone
