= Saphan Chulalongkorn railway halt =

Railway stop in Na Mueang, Thailand

Saphan Chulalongkorn สะพานจุฬาลงกรณ์
- Railway halt after its closure in June 2024

General information
- Other names: Chulalongkorn Bridge
- Location: Rotfai Road, Na Mueang Subdistrict, Ratchaburi City
- Owner: State Railway of Thailand
- Line: Southern Line
- Platforms: 1
- Tracks: 1

Other information
- Station code: จา.

History
- Former names: Saphan Ratchaburi

Services
Preceding station	State Railway of Thailand	Following station
Ban Kluay towards Hua Lamphong or Krung Thep Aphiwat	Southern Line	Ratchaburi towards Su-ngai Kolok
Location

Saphan Chulalongkorn Railway Halt (officially Chulalongkorn Bridge) is a railway halt located in Na Mueang Subdistrict, Ratchaburi City, Ratchaburi. it is located 100.141 km (62.2 mi) from Thon Buri Railway Station. It is adjacent to Chulalongkorn Bridge, of which the halt is named after. It was previously known as Saphan Ratchaburi (Ratchaburi Bridge) before changing its name in February 2005.

Since the opening of the double-track section between Nakhon Pathom to Chumphon in June 2024, the halt has been indefinitely closed.
