= List of Ghost Stories episodes =

Ghost Stories is an American horror anthology television series that originally aired from 1997 to 1998 on the cable channel FOX Family.

The following is a list of episodes for the television series. During the series run there was a total of 44 episodes.

== Episodes ==
No.	Title	Directed by	Written by	Original release date
1	"Back Ward"	Jeffrey Fine	David Weddle, Bradley Thompson	28 September 1997
The new chief psychiatrist at an old mental institution is haunted by Images from the hospital's terrible past.
2	"Last Flight Out"	Joe Wiecha	Steve Brown	28 September 1997
Being the only survivor of a plane accident previous before her next trip, a woman is haunted by ghosts of her past.
3	"Step Sister"	Stuart Taylor	Tim Minear	5 October 1997
When a young girl's mother remarries, she moves into her stepfather's house, only to find herself haunted by the ghost of her jealous stepbrother. But soon she discovers that he's trying to warn her – about his own death and the danger she now finds herself in.
4	"You'll Always Be Mine"	Greg Francis	James Thorpe	5 October 1997
A young woman is stalked by the ghost of an obsessive suitor. After she's found murdered, the cop who failed to protect her is haunted by her cries for help from beyond the grave.
5	"Wake In Fear"	Jeffrey Fine	Robin Jill Bernheim	13 October 1997
An overworked intern is plagued by dreams in which he sees corpses being wheeled to the hospital morgue. They turn out to be premonitions of patients about to die the next day on the operating table.
6	"Blood Money"	Stuart Taylor	Jo Dondis, Michelle Gendelman	13 October 1997
A crooked lawman hounds an ex-con bank robber to determine the whereabouts of his buried loot. Upon retrieving the ill-gotten booty, the dirty cop discovers to his horror that the money's even dirtier – it's haunted by the spirits of those who were killed during the heist.
7	"Landscape of Lost Dreams"	Jeffrey Fine	Frederick Rappaport	20 October 1997
A couple returns to their honeymoon hotel in a last-ditch effort to save their crumbling marriage. When the wife vanishes, the husband is suspected of killing her. It turns out she has disappeared into a seemingly bucolic landscape painting.
8	"Cold In The Grave"	Joe Wiecha	Frederick Rappaport	20 October 1997
A divorced, embittered repairman murders a woman he picked up in the bar, stashes her body in an industrial refrigerator, and dumps it into the river. Subsequently, in her quest for revenge, the ghost of his victim haunts the refrigerators he repairs.
9	"Personal Demons"	Greg Francis	Robin Jill Bernheim	27 October 1997
A social worker pursuing a mentally unbalanced Wall-Street man who escaped from a halfway house, discovers that her client is prodded to murderous actions by a malevolent demon. Guest starring Tony Hale.
10	"Cloistered"	Stuart Taylor	Nina Berry	27 October 1997
A lonely care-giver to the elderly falls for a man who she believes is kept in his house by his domineering mother. But as their secret relationship grows, she is horrified to learn that the young man is not what he seems.
11	"All Night Diner"	Stuart Taylor	Tim Minear	3 November 1997
Abandoning her family for her lover, a woman drives out of town and stops at an all night diner. Inside, she is harassed by strange customers who know too much of her past, causing her to flee to another diner. But to her horror, she discovers that it's the same diner with the same tormentors. Turns out she was killed in a car crash and is trapped in her own purgatory of guilt.
12	"Beware The Muse"	Joe Wiecha	David Weddle, Bradley Thompson	3 November 1997
A tabloid reporter concocts a story about a long-dead serial killer, and unwittingly resurrects the killer's ghost.
13	"Blazes"	Stuart Taylor	Gary Glasberg	10 November 1997
A hero fireman, who is actually a compulsive arsonist, forges an unholy alliance with a mysterious homeless man with more than a passing interest in blazes.
14	"Cold Dark Space"	Greg Francis	David Kemper	10 November 1997
A frenzied man finds himself trapped in a nightmarish hospital room. Surrounded by the dead from his past, it appears he's lost in a limbo world between life and death. We discover this is all the delusion of an astronaut adrift in space with his dead co-pilots as company.
15	"Green-Eyed Monster"	Stuart Taylor	Paul B. Margolis	17 November 1997
A jealous husband becomes a green-eyed monster when he finds his wife giving undue attention to their backyard tree — the very tree from which her ex-boyfriend committed suicide.
16	"Sara's Friends"	Joe Wiecha	Jonathan Robert Kaplan	17 November 1997
A thief, determined to steal valuable jewelry from a city morgue's storage room, romances a bizarre morgue attendant – a woman less comfortable relating to the living than to her dead charges.
17	"Beat The Reaper"	Stuart Taylor	Paul B. Margolis	24 November 1997
A man on death row prays for a governor's pardon. One night he has a ghostly visitation from his dead partner, who shows him how to escape. But trapped in the bowels of the prison, the man is terrified to learn that the ghost is the Angel of Death, intent upon keeping his prize, and not being cheated.
18	"Conscience"	Jeffrey Fine	Alan Swayze	19 January 1998
A good man who has done some terrible things finds that his conscience has a unique way of giving himself away – whether he wants it or not.
19	"Sleep No More"	Joseph Wiecha	Eric Estrin	19 January 1998
A dream psychologist who takes on her patients’ nightmares yearns to escape her work and insensitive husband. But when her nightmares start to invade her waking hours, she seeks refuge – into a peaceful dreamscape.
20	"Point Hope"	Jeffrey Fine	Ralph Phillips	26 January 1998
A woman is saved from suicide by a mysterious lighthouse keeper with more on his mind than her salvation.
21	"The Stainless Blade"	Joseph Wiecha	Robin Jill Bernheim	26 January 1998
A young magician and his ambitious wife are invited to the home of a retired grand master. Hoping to discover the secret of the master magician's famed sword-skewering act, the couple get more than they bargained for.
22	"State of Grace"	Jeffrey Fine	Peter M. Lenkov	2 February 1998
A lonely hospital orderly falls in love with a beautiful woman who just happens to be comatose. A la Sleeping Beauty she is reawakened by his feelings for her – yet only he alone can see her in a wakened state.
23	"Fatal Distraction"	Joseph Wiecha	Frank Henenlotter	2 February 1998
A frustrated writer is tempted to cheat on his wife by a mysterious woman he sees through his apartment window. But when he discovers that she is a ghost, it's too late—for she sees him as the man who left her years ago, and intends to get her revenge.
24	"The New Nanny"	Stuart Taylor	Peter M. Lenkov	9 February 1998
A nanny spends a terrifying first night with her strange new charge.
25	"Heartsick"	Jeffrey Fine	Gary Glasberg	9 February 1998
The recipient of a heart transplant finds herself attracted to a stranger she sees on a train. Turns out she's being controlled by the ghost of the donor – the erstwhile lover of the man on the train.
26	"At Death's Door"	Robby Henson	Paul B. Margolis	16 February 1998
At the end of the Civil War, a grieving woman, whose husband is missing in action, awaits a doctor to care for her ill son. To make matters worse, the boy has had visions of the Angel of Death coming to their door, and when a mysterious soldier appears seeking shelter, the woman's fears begin to mount. In the end, it turns out to be a case of mistaken identity – the doctor himself is the Angel of Death, who has come to take the woman, not her son.
27	"Underground"	Greg Francis	John Lafia	16 February 1998
An attendant, working in a subterranean garage, finds himself trapped in a nightmarish underworld.
28	"It's Only A Movie"	Stuart Taylor	Paul B. Margolis, Frederick Rappaport	23 February 1998
Joey Howell, jaded horror film fan and video store clerk extraordinaire, wins a fantastic prize from his favorite “B” horror film star, Mindy McCobb – the role of an extra in her newest film. But when he arrives on the set, Joey finds that things are not as they seem. The movie is being played out for real – and he's to be the star victim.
29	"Consumers"	Stuart Taylor	Peter M. Lenkov	23 February 1998
A young guy gets a job working the night shift at a supermarket frequented by the neighborhood elderly. Much to his horror, he discovers that they aren’t shopping for denture cream and hearing aid batteries – but for young bodies to take over and inhabit.
30	"From The Ashes"	Jeffrey Fine	Frederick Rappaport	2 March 1998
An Asian man, a refugee from his homeland's murderous regime, is haunted by a trio of death squad enforcers – all of whom were executed years ago.
31	"The Scream House"	Stuart Taylor	Joe Gannon	2 March 1998
A man drags his wife back to the idealized neighborhood of his youth, but a trip to the old boardwalk fun house provides a terrifying glimpse into a past best forgotten.
32	"You'll Wake The Dead"	T.S. O'Kelly	Robin Jill Bernheim	27 April 1998
A cruel young couple wage a campaign of noisy terror to evict an old lady from their duplex. The old lady dies, only to return to exact retribution from her tormentors.
33	"Resting Place"	Greg Francis	Steve Brown	27 April 1998
A grieving father refuses to accept the loss of his son, presumed dead from the bombing of a clinic in Africa. When the son miraculously returns home, his mother slowly begins to suspect the truth – his father's undying love has resurrected the living dead.
34	"The Inheritance"	Greg Francis	Alison Lea Bingeman	4 May 1998
An African-American couple are terrorized in their new home by the ghost of a racist man. In the end, we discover the ghost's true motive – unable to rest in peace, he's been seeking forgiveness from his sins.
35	"Mirror, Mirror…"	Stuart Taylor	James Thorpe	4 May 1998
A haggish old dowager is eventually murdered by her put-upon niece and young boyfriend, only to return from the dead to haunt them in the reflection of the mirrors throughout their home.
36	"The House That Spilled Tears"	Stuart Taylor	Robin Jill Bernheim	11 May 1998
A slumlord, condemned to house arrest in her own decrepit property, is haunted by the specters of tenants who suffered and died in the building.
37	"Winner Takes All"	Stuart Taylor	Carey W., Chad Hayes	11 May 1998
A ruthless CEO gathers three of his executives for a most unusual poker game – the stakes of which prove more than anyone bargained for.
38	"Cabin Fever"	Stuart Taylor	Paul B. Margolis	18 May 1998
Art Jones, who has faked his death in a mountain blizzard and killed his climbing guide in the process, hides out on a steamy tropical island, awaiting a hefty insurance settlement. After eight months in isolation, Art is now being tormented by the ghost of the climbing guide, who during a blistering heat wave turns Art's shack into a freezing cage of guilt.
39	"Bless Me Father"	Greg Francis	Scott Peters	18 May 1998
A young disillusioned priest is sent to take over a dying parish, but finds his presence is resented by the older priest. The young priest soon finds himself haunted by the ghost of a girl he left behind to join the clergy.
40	"Erased"	Jeffrey Fine	Robin Jill Bernheim	25 May 1998
Locked in a stale marriage with her lackluster husband, a youth-obsessed woman starts to suspect that he is creating a young woman to replace her. As she starts to disappear, she learns too late that the woman is actually the younger version of herself – the one her husband fell in love with many years ago.
41	"Going Down"	Frank Wayne	Paul B. Margolis	25 May 1998
The experience of having been trapped in a collapsed building has left Kate Bradshaw claustrophobic and mute. Now, as she's held hostage in an elevator by a disgruntled security guard, Kate finds herself confronting her worst fear. As she re-lives the terrible disaster from her past – the smoke, the debris, the screams of the dying – she pleads for release from the desperate guard. But strangely enough, a transference begins to take place – as Kate gathers her strength, the ghosts of her ordeal start haunting the guard. In the end, Kate triumphs over her fears as well as her captor—the guard winds up a hopeless claustrophobic in a jail cell, while Kate's ability to speak is restored.
42	"Denial"	Jeffrey Fine	Paul B. Margolis	1 June 1998
After his wife's murderer is finally sentenced, a man starts to see visions of the crime, revealing a horrible truth that he's managed to hide from himself.
43	"Parting Shot"	Frank Wayne	Fred Golan	1 June 1998
Having missed the perfect photo of a celebrity she's hounded for years, a paparazza seeks the ultimate shot – of the now dead celebrity lying in state at a funeral home. But after finally getting the picture, she finds that the ghost of the celebrity starts to relentlessly hound her.
44	"I Heard You Call My Name"	Greg Francis	Stephen Neigher	8 June 1998
After her young son drowns during a beach field trip, a school teacher is haunted, convinced her ghostly son wants to take her with him. But when she saves the life of another boy, she realizes her own son was trying to set her free from her guilt.

== See also ==
- List of ghost films
