= Demonic Beauty =

Tamnan Krasue/Demonic Beauty
- Theatrical release poster
- Directed by: Bin Banluerit
- Written by: Yuthlert Sippapak
- Starring: Lakana Wattanawongsiri; Nak-rob Traipoe
- Production company: Twin Pictures
- Distributed by: Sahamongkol Film International
- Release date: November 15, 2002
- Running time: 101 minutes
- Country: Thailand
- Languages: Thai; Khmer

Tamnan Krasue/Demonic Beauty (Thai: ตำนานกระสือ, also Tamnan Krasue) is a 2002 Thai supernatural horror film written and directed by Bin Banluerit. The film concerns the krasue ghost legend that is common in Southeast Asian countries.

== Plot ==
The Thai have defeated the Khmer Empire in the mid-18th century and taken the beautiful Princess Tarawatee prisoner. Captivated by her beauty, the Thai ruler marries her, but later discovers her in the arms of another man. He sentences them both to death, ordering the man to be beheaded and the Princess to be burnt alive.

While awaiting execution, the Princess learns from a fellow inmate that a young woman named Daow, who is her exact physical double, lives in a nearby village. As the flames begin to consume her, the Princess sends her spirit to possess Daow. However, just as her spirit departs to find her double, Daow is killed by a magical spell. The Princess's spirit therefore enters Daow's dead body, which unexpectedly comes back to life, astonishing everyone.

The revived Daow is now partly herself and partly a vengeful ghost. By day, she leads a normal life, but at night an overwhelming hunger for blood and entrails takes hold of her. Her head separates from her body to satisfy this insatiable appetite. Her nocturnal activities soon cause fear and consternation among the villagers.

== See also ==
- List of ghost films
