= Ban Kluay railway station =

Railway station in Tha Rap, Thailand

Coordinates: 13.5877°N 99.8157°E

Ban Kluay บ้านกล้วย
- Station in 2025

General information
- Location: Tha Rap Subdistrict, Ratchaburi City
- Owner: State Railway of Thailand
- Line: Southern Line
- Platforms: 2
- Tracks: 2

Other information
- Station code: าก.

Services
Preceding station	State Railway of Thailand	Following station
Chet Samian towards Hua Lamphong or Krung Thep Aphiwat	Southern Line	Saphan Chulalongkorn Halt towards Su-ngai Kolok
Location

Ban Kluay station (Thai: สถานีบ้านกล้วย) is a railway station located in Tha Rap Subdistrict, Ratchaburi City, Ratchaburi. It is a class 3 railway station located 94.64 km (58.8 mi) from Thon Buri railway station.

== Gallery ==
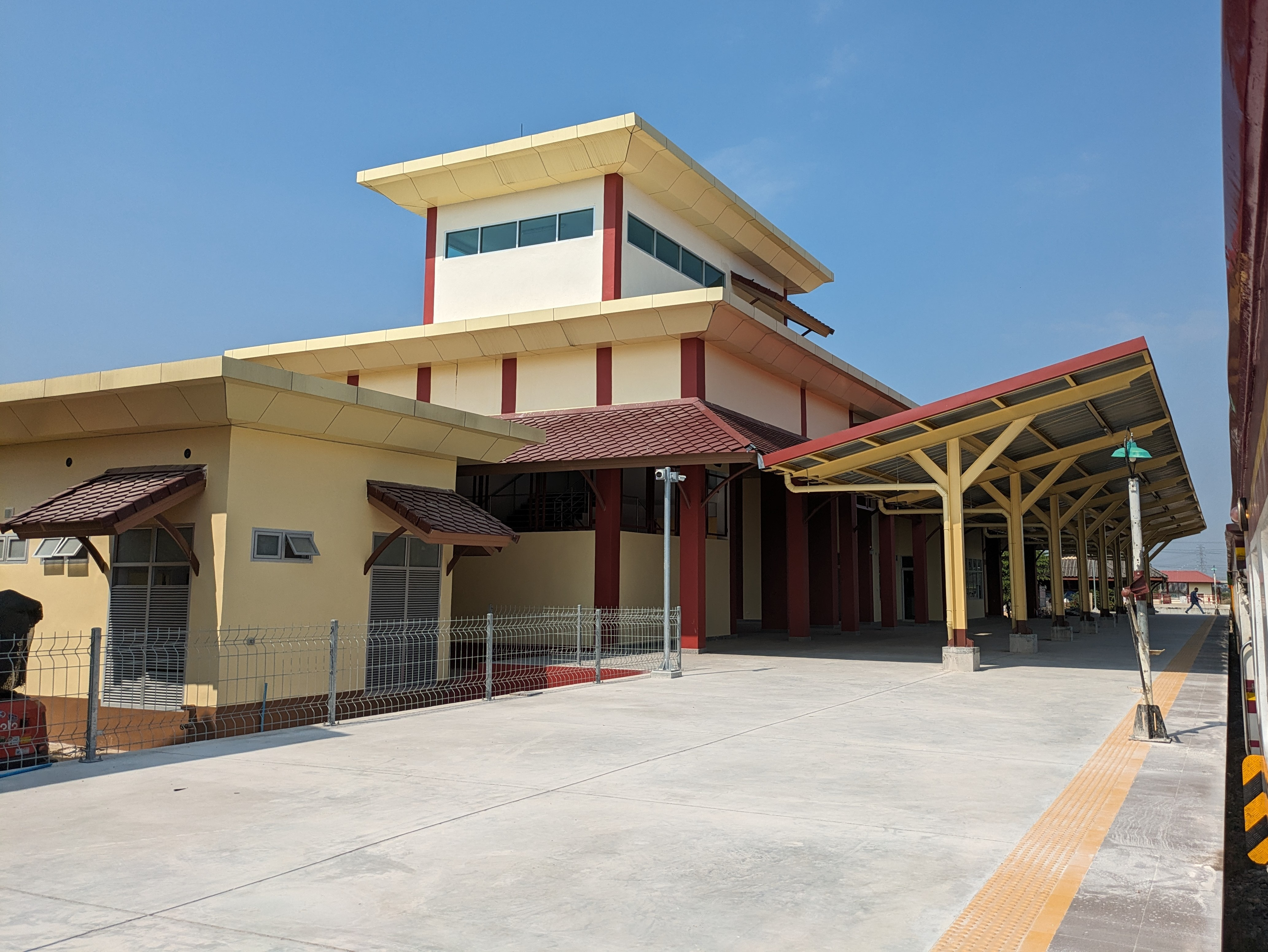
New station building

Old station in 2022 during the double-track construction
