= Chulalongkorn Bridge =

Bridge in Ratchaburi Province, Thailand

Chulalongkorn Bridge สะพานจุฬาลงกรณ์
- Chulalongkorn Bridge in 2024
- Coordinates: 13°32′28″N 99°49′27″E
- Carries: 1 Railway track
- Crosses: Mae Klong River
- Locale: Ratchaburi Province
- Official name: Chulalongkorn Bridge
- Maintained by: State Railway of Thailand

Characteristics
- Design: Truss bridge
- Total length: 149.7 metres
- Longest span: 49.9 metres

History
- Constructed by: Takigami Industries Co., Ltd.
- Opened: 19 June 1903
- Rebuilt: 1960

Location
- Interactive map of Chulalongkorn Bridge

Chulalongkorn Bridge (Thai: สะพานจุฬาลงกรณ์) is a three-span truss railway bridge in Thailand crossing Mae Klong River. It is situated in Mueang Ratchaburi District, Ratchaburi Province, on the Southern Line Railway and paralleled to Thanarat Bridge. The bridge is also referred to as Saphan Dam (Black Bridge) or Saphan Ratchaburi (Ratchaburi Bridge).

== History ==
Chulalongkorn Bridge first opened on 19 June 1903 as part of the first phase of Southern Line from Bangkok Noi to Phetchaburi. The original bridge functioned as both road and railway bridge. The bridge is named after King Chulalongkorn.

During World War II, Chulalongkorn Bridge was a crucial bombing target and had been bombed by the Allied aircraft numerous times until it collapsed in February 1945. The Imperial Japanese Army had attempted to build a temporary wooden bridge next to the damaged bridge, but the bridge collapsed during a test and the steam locomotive plunged into the river. After the war, the bridge was rebuilt in 1960 as a single-track railway bridge and officially reopened on 26 September 1961. The bridge received its second renovation in 2020.

The second Chulalongkorn Bridge, a cable-stayed bridge, was built in 2023 to the east of the original bridge as part of the double-track section from Nakhon Pathom to Chumphon. The bridge was designed without supporting beams under the middle span to avoid undetonated wartime bombs and the remains of steam locomotive underwater.

== Gallery ==
Chulalongkorn Bridge, viewed from Thanarat Bridge.

The new cable bridge to the east of the original bridge.

The second Chulalongkorn Bridge

== See also ==
- Saphan Chulalongkorn Halt: an adjacent railway halt
