= My Mother Is An Arb =

My Mother Is Arb
- The Cambodian film poster.
- Starring: Chan Dara Thy
- Distributed by: Angkorwat Productions
- Release date: 1980
- Country: Cambodia
- Language: Khmer

My Mother Is Arb (Khmer: កូនអើយ ម្តាយអាប, UNGEGN: Kon Aeuy, Mday Ab [koːn ʔaəj mɗaːj ʔaːp]; lit. 'Son! Mom is Arb', also known as Krasue Mom) is a Cambodian horror film.

This film has the distinction of being the first movie made in Cambodia after the Khmer Rouge era.

== Background ==
This Khmer folklore-based movie was produced shortly after the fall of Pol Pot's destructive Democratic Kampuchea regime, during the painful rebuilding of Cambodian cultural life in the pro-Soviet People's Republic of Kampuchea. Since the Khmer Rouge had suppressed and persecuted Khmer folklore, this movie based on traditional legends became an immediate success with the Cambodian public after years of cultural uprooting.

Kon Aeuy Madai Ahp is based on a Cambodian myth about a malevolent spirit called Ap or Arp. This spirit has a female head and bloody entrails instead of a body. It hovers over the ground in the night, haunting places and scaring people. The special effect of the Arp character was achieved by gluing pig's entrails to the head of a doll.

== Plot ==
A young boy lives alone with his mother in a big house in a remote part of Cambodia. One night, he discovers that his mother is an evil spirit Arp.

After that night, the boy lives in terror. He is afraid that his mother will kill him at any time, but pretends he does not know his mother's secret. The boy wonders what will become of him in the future, living with a malevolent Arp and worries that others will discover his mother's secret as well.
