= Krasue Valentine =

2006 film by Yuthlert Sippapak

- The Thai movie poster.
- Directed by: Yuthlert Sippapak
- Written by: Yuthlert Sippapak
- Produced by: Yuthlert Sippapak; Amorn Chanapai
- Starring: Pitisak Yaowananon; Ploy Jindachote
- Cinematography: Somkid Phukphong
- Edited by: Tawat Siripong
- Music by: Hualampong Riddim
- Distributed by: Sahamongkol Film International
- Release date: 9 February 2006
- Running time: 94 minutes
- Country: Thailand
- Language: Thai

Krasue Valentine (Thai: กระสือวาเลนไทน์, also known as Ghost of Valentine) is a 2006 Thai romance-horror film written and directed by Yuthlert Sippapak. The film concerns the krasue ghost legend that is common in Southeast Asian countries.

== Plot ==
Sao is a nurse who comes to work at an older, rundown hospital in Bangkok. Witnessing her arrival is Num, a disabled orderly. Num is shy, but a little girl selling roses convinces him to buy one. He gives her money and the girl in turn gives the rose to Sao, forming a bond between the two.

Sao takes room in an old house behind the hospital, near a disused gymnasium and the old morgue. She is getting over a breakup with an old boyfriend who left her because she turns into a ghost. And, indeed, unbeknownst to her, she does turn into the krasue ghost that very night, scaring the hospital's security guard.

== Cast ==
- Pitisak Yaowananon as Num
- Ploy Jindachote as Sao
- Kowit Wattanakul as Doctor
- Viyada Umarin as Paoun

== See also ==
- List of ghost films
