= Chet Samian railway station =

Railroad depot in Thailand

Coordinates: 13.6361°N 99.8211°E

Chet Samian เจ็ดเสมียน
- Station in 2025

General information
- Location: Ratchaburi Local Road No. 2032, Mu 5 (Ban Chet Samian), Chet Samian Subdistrict, Photharam District, Ratchaburi
- Owner: State Railway of Thailand
- Line: Southern Line
- Platforms: 3
- Tracks: 3

Other information
- Station code: จม.

History
- Opened: 19 June 1903
- Rebuilt: 2024
- Former names: Ban Chet Samian

Services
Preceding station	State Railway of Thailand	Following station
Photharam towards Hua Lamphong or Krung Thep Aphiwat	Southern Line	Ban Kluay towards Su-ngai Kolok
Location

Chet Samian station (Thai: สถานีเจ็ดเสมียน) is a Class 3 railway station in Chet Samian Subdistrict, Photharam District, Ratchaburi, 89.276 km (55.5 mi) from Thon Buri railway station.

== History ==
The station opened on 19 June 1903 as part of the first phase of the Southern Line from Bangkok Noi to Phetchaburi at Kilometer 88.87. It was previously named Ban Chet Samian before shortened to Chet Samian after 1929.

The first Chet Samian station building, opened in 1903, was a 2-story building made out of wood. In 2010, it was demolished and replaced with a 2-story concrete building. After the construction of the Nakhon Pathom - Chumphon double-track section, the station was relocated 400 meters south of the original location, receiving a new station building and elevated platforms.

== Gallery ==
The first generation station building. Used from 1903 to 2010 (Picture taken in 2009)

The second-generation station building. Used from 2010 to 2024

The third-generation station building. Opened in 2024
