= The Unearthing =

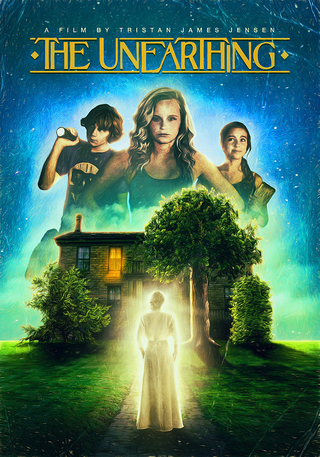
- Film poster
- Directed by: Tristan James Jensen
- Written by: Tristan James Jensen
- Produced by: Tristan James Jensen
- Starring: Riley Yeary; Angelina Macsiopinto; Kaleb Miller; Scott Novotny; Gina Novotny; Joe Pasutti
- Cinematography: Tristan James Jensen
- Edited by: Tristan James Jensen
- Music by: Reuben Spencer
- Release date: April 10, 2015
- Running time: 58 minutes
- Country: United States
- Language: English

The Unearthing is a 2015 American coming of age drama film directed by Tristan James Jensen and starring Riley Yeary, Angelina Masciopinto, and Kaleb Miller. The film follows a girl named Autumn who moves to Stillwater, Minnesota for the summer. She meets two misfit children, Charlotte and Parker, and together they seek to give a ghost closure.

== Cast ==
- Riley Yeary as Autumn
- Angelina Macsiopinto as Charlotte
- Kaleb Miller as Parker
- Scott Novotny as Jim
- Gina Novotny as Gertrude
- Joe Pasutti as The Warden
- Sean Pallas as Curator
- Theresa Larson as Librarian

== Production ==
Production began in the summer of 2013 and the total amount of filming took place in about 25 days. Much of the film was unwritten at the time of filming. The project was made with no budget and everyone working on it volunteered.

== Reception ==
A non-finalized version of the film had screenings in Stillwater in late 2014. The earlier cut of the film was finally completed in the spring of 2015 and was screened at several festivals including Minneapolis Saint Paul International Film Festival, Alhambra Theater Film Festival, Fort Myers Beach Film Festival, Duluth Superior Film Festival, Broke Student International Film Festival, and EDU Film Festival, with the latter two being special exhibitions. The trailer won the Best Student Trailer award at the International Movie Trailer Festival in 2013 and the film itself won the Best Student Film award at Fort Myers Beach Film Festival in 2015.

== Release ==
It was announced on social media that a remastered version of the film was being worked on with new cuts, color grade, sound mix, and a new scene. It was released in late March on Amazon Prime and the Steam Store.
