= Photharam district =

Photharam โพธาราม
- District
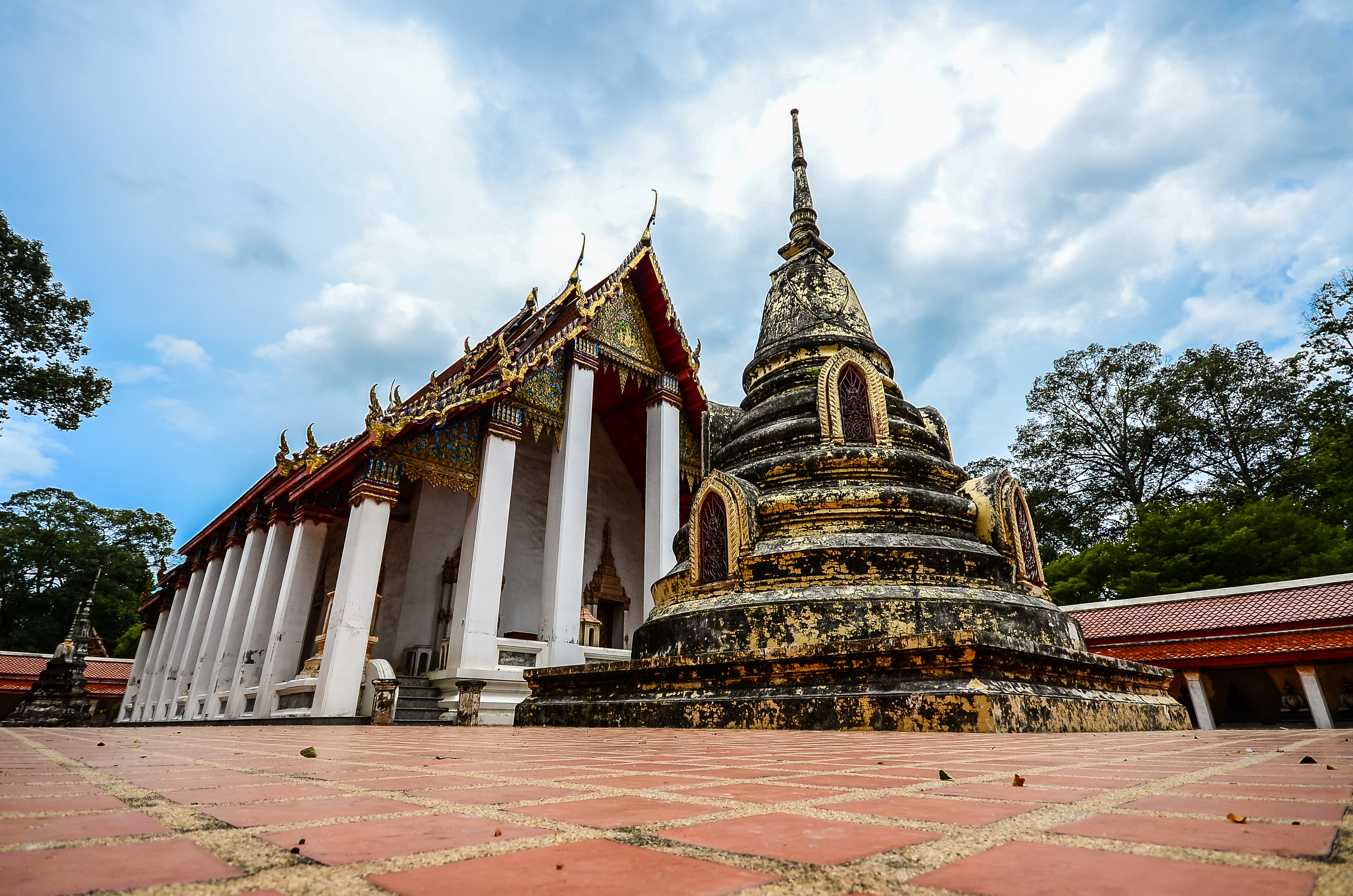
- Ubosot (main hall) and chedi (pagoda) of Wat Khanon a local ancient temple

- District location in Ratchaburi province
- Coordinates: 13°41′32″N 99°51′13″E
- Country: Thailand
- Province: Ratchaburi

Area
  - Total: 417.009 km^{2} (161.008 sq mi)

Population (2017)
  - Total: 136,745
  - Density: 327.91/km^{2} (849.3/sq mi)
- Time zone: UTC+7 (ICT)
- Postal code: 70120
- Geocode: 7007

Photharam (Thai: โพธาราม, pronounced [pʰōː.tʰāː.rāːm]) is a district (amphoe) in the northern part of Ratchaburi province, western Thailand.

== History ==
Photharam was a district (khwaeng) of Mueang Ratchaburi in the 19th century. In 1836 the district office was relocated from the mouth of Bang Tanod canal to the east bank of the Mae Klong River opposite Wat Chaloem Art. On 10 March 1952 it was moved to its present location in the municipality of Photharam.

== Geography ==
Neighboring districts are (from the east clockwise) Bang Phae, Damnoen Saduak, Mueang Ratchaburi, and Chom Bueng of Ratchaburi Province; Tha Muang of Kanchanaburi province; Ban Pong of Ratchaburi Province; and Mueang Nakhon Pathom of Nakhon Pathom province.

The important water resource is the Mae Klong River.

== Administration ==
The district is divided into 19 sub-districts (tambons), which are further subdivided into 156 villages (mubans). There are six municipal (thesaban) areas. The town (thesaban mueang) Photharam covers tambon Photaram. The townships (thesaban tambon) Ban Lueak, Ban Sing, and Chet Samian each cover the same-named tambons completely. The township Khao Khuang covers tambon Nang Kaeo and parts of Chamrae, Tao Pun, and Khao Cha-ngum. Township Nong Pho covers parts of tambon Nong Pho. There are a further 14 tambon administrative organizations (TAO).

1.	Photharam	โพธาราม
2.	Don Krabueang	ดอนกระเบื้อง
3.	Nong Pho	หนองโพ
4.	Ban Lueak	บ้านเลือก
5.	Khlong Ta Khot	คลองตาคต
6.	Ban Khong	บ้านฆ้อง
7.	Ban Sing	บ้านสิงห์
8.	Don Sai	ดอนทราย
9.	Chet Samian	เจ็ดเสมียน
10.	Khlong Khoi	คลองข่อย
11.	Chamrae	ชำแระ
12.	Soi Fa	สร้อยฟ้า
13.	Tha Chumphon	ท่าชุมพล
14.	Bang Tanot	บางโตนด
15.	Tao Pun	เตาปูน
16.	Nang Kaeo	นางแก้ว
17.	Thammasen	ธรรมเสน
18.	Khao Cha-ngum	เขาชะงุ้ม
19.	Nong Kwang	หนองกวาง
