= Benjamin Simonds =

American militia officer (1726–1807)

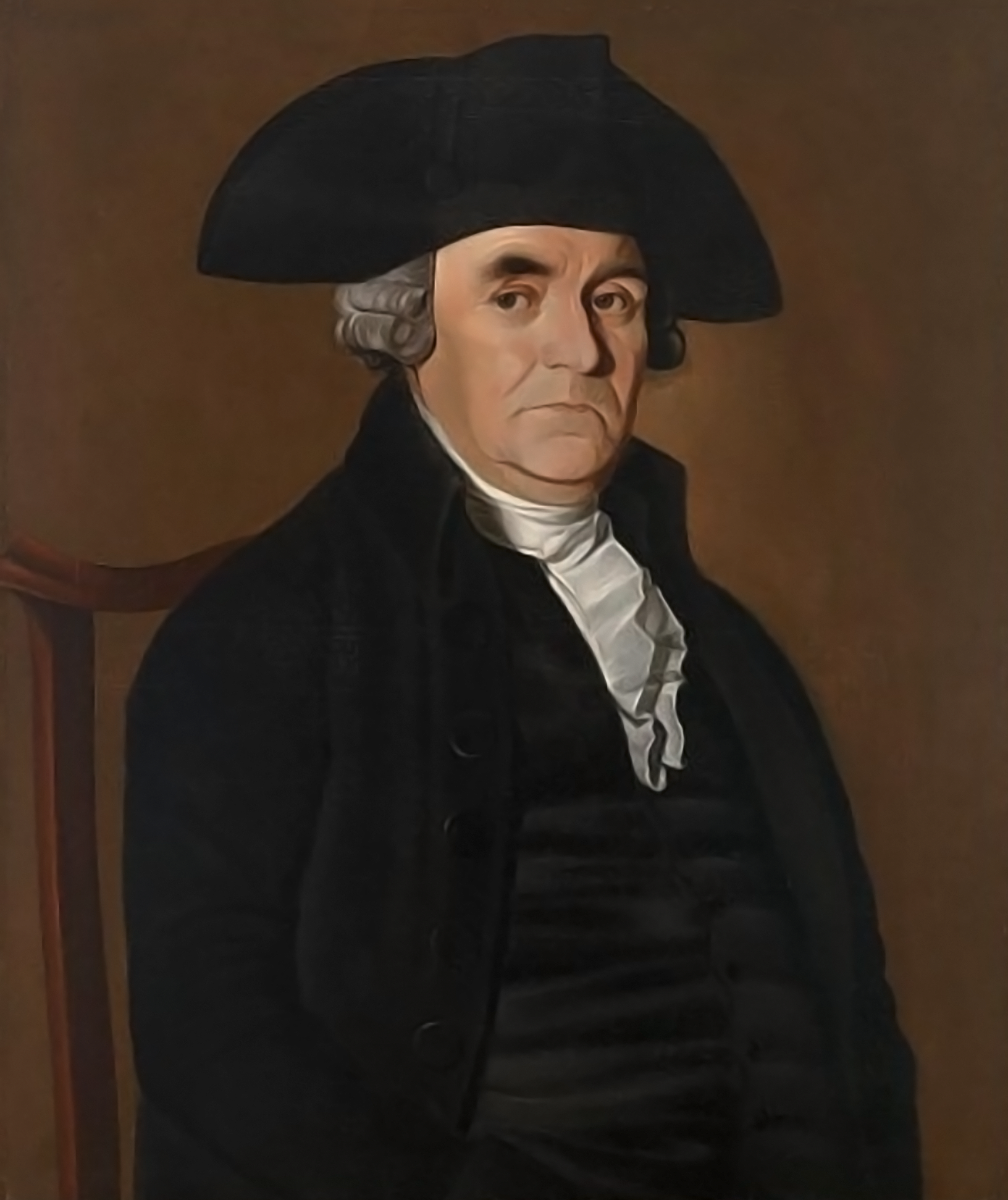
- Portrait of Benjamin Simonds by William Jennys
- Born: 23 February 1726; Killingly, Connecticut Colony, British America
- Died: 11 April 1807 (aged 81)
- Military career
- Rank: Colonel
- Commands: 2nd Berkshire County Regiment
- Conflicts: King George's War; Siege of Fort Massachusetts; French and Indian War; American Revolutionary War; Battle of Bennington; Battle of White Plains; Battle of Bemis Heights

Benjamin Simonds (12 February 1726 – 11 April 1807), was an American militia officer who served in King George's War, the French and Indian War and the American Revolutionary War. He was colonel of the all-Berkshire regiment of about five hundred men known as the "Berkshire Boys" during the Revolutionary War. His regiment, the 2nd Berkshire County Regiment, fought in the Battle of Bennington in the summer of 1777.

== Early life ==
Benjamin Simonds was born on 12 February 1726 in Killingly, Connecticut. He was the son of Joseph and Rachel Simonds and was baptized at the First Congregational Church of Killingly (now the First Congregational Church of Putnam, Connecticut) on 6 March 1726. His father Joseph Simonds, born 8 June 1689 in what is now Lexington, Massachusetts, was a cordwainer who married his first wife Rachel c. 1714. Joseph Simonds was one of the first settlers of Londonderry, Province of New Hampshire in 1719 but by 1723 had moved to Killingly, Connecticut Colony where Benjamin Simonds was born. Benjamin's mother, Rachel, died c. 1728. Joseph's second marriage was in c. 1729 to Mary and third marriage was to Hannah Abbe in 1738. Joseph remained in Killingly until about 1741 when he moved with his family to Ware, Massachusetts.

== Early military career ==
Benjamin Simonds’ military career began during King George's War in 1744. At the start of the war, Governor William Shirley ordered that a line of forts be built from Colrain, Massachusetts to the Dutch settlements, the strongest and westernmost of which was called Fort Massachusetts. Beginning in the summer of 1745, Fort Massachusetts was garrisoned and Benjamin Simonds was at that time a part of that garrison. On 19 August 1746, Fort Massachusetts was attacked by an army of French soldiers and their Indian allies and surrendered the following day. On the first night after their capture, the party camped near the river at the spot where Simonds would eventually buy and build a house, known as the Col. Benjamin Simonds House. The French and Indians then took the members of the garrison captive to Fort Saint-Frédéric on Lake Champlain then to Montreal on 10 September 1746 before reaching Quebec on 15 September 1746.

The journey to Quebec was later described by the fort’s chaplain, Rev. John Norris, who mentions Benjamin Simonds, or "Brother Simon" as he called him, at several points in his narrative. Norris reported on 22 August 1746 that "the Indians also carry’d in their Canoes Br Simon & John Aldrich, and Perry’s Wife, down the River about ten miles." On 23 August 1746, he reported that "the French still carrying Smeed’s and Scot’s Wives and Children, the Indians finding Horses for Brothers Simon and John Aldrich."

According to Nehemiah How, who wrote another captivity narrative, Benjamin Simonds was one of the captives from Fort Massachusetts who arrived at the prison in Quebec on 15 September 1746. Only nine of the soldiers captured at Fort Massachusetts returned home and Benjamin Simonds and John Aldrich, both sick in the hospital at Quebec, were the last to return in October 1747. According to his petition dated 12 December 1749, Benjamin Simonds, after his return from captivity, was "unable to get Home till 14 days after, and was weak & low and unable for a whole month to provide for himself." He was awarded £20, 9s. for his service. During the Seven Years' War, Benjamin Simonds was again stationed at Fort Massachusetts where he was listed serving as a private in a company commanded by Captain Ephraim Williams from 14 October 1754 to 28 March 1755 and then again in a company commanded by Isaac Wyman from 29 March 1755 to 26 November 1755.

== Revolutionary War ==
Benjamin Simonds is most known for his leadership in the American Revolutionary War. On 30 August 1775, Benjamin Simonds was commissioned Colonel of the 2nd Berkshire County Regiment of the Massachusetts Militia. It is reported that Col. Benjamin Simonds and his regiment fought at the Battle of White Plains on 28 October 1776. The regiment was then stationed at Fort Ticonderoga from 16 December 1776 to 22 March 1777. On 13 August 1777, he met with Gen. John Stark and Col. Seth Warner in a council of war at the so-called Catamount Tavern before the Battle of Bennington and commanded his Berkshire regiment in that engagement. He was a Colonel until 1780. During the Revolutionary War, Simonds forced his slave Ishmael Thomas to take his place in the Continental Army in exchange for being manumitted.

== Family ==
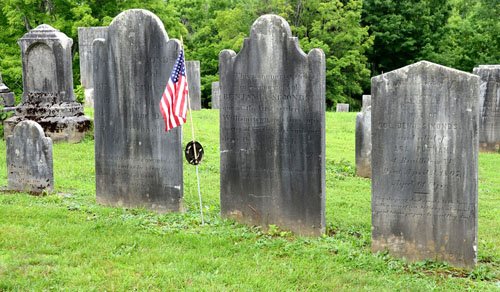
Simonds' grave

On 23 April 1752, Benjamin Simonds was married by Joseph Hawley in Northampton, Massachusetts to Mary Davis who was born 12 November 1730 in Brookfield, Massachusetts, daughter of Joseph Davis Sr. and Experience Willis. Benjamin and Mary had seven daughters and three sons, all born in Williamstown, Massachusetts:

- Rachel Simonds (1753 – 1802)
- Justin Simonds (b. 1755, died young)
- Sarah Simonds (b. 1757)
- Marcy Simonds (1759 – 1834)
- Joseph Simonds (1762 – 1838)
- Prudence Simonds (1763 – 1844)
- Ablina Simonds (1765 – 1846)
- Electa Simonds (1767 – 1841)
- Polly Simonds (b. 1771)
- Benjamin Simonds (1773 – 1786)

Mary died 7 June 1798, and Benjamin Simonds married Anna Collins on 4 November 1798.

== Later years ==
Many years later, trustees requested that Simonds join the committee to build "West College," in accordance with Colonel Ephraim Williams’ will. It was finished in 1791 and was named the "Free School," until 1793 when Williams College officially received its charter.

Simonds died in 1807 and was buried in what is now known as Westview Cemetery in Williamstown, Massachusetts.
