= Col. Benjamin Simond House =

Historic house in Massachusetts, United States

- Col. Benjamin Simonds House
- U.S. National Register of Historic Places
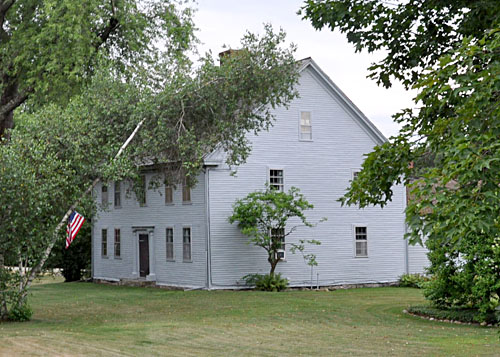

- Location within Massachusetts Location within the United States
- Location: 643 Simonds Rd., Williamstown, Massachusetts
- Coordinates: 42°43′47″N 73°12′20″W
- Area: 1.64 acres (0.66 ha)
- Built: 1769
- Architectural style: Georgian
- NRHP reference No.: 83000570
- Added to NRHP: September 1, 1983

The Col. Benjamin Simonds House is a historic house at 643 Simonds Road in Williamstown, Massachusetts. The colonial style wood-frame house was built in 1770 by Benjamin Simonds, a veteran of the French and Indian Wars, who was one of Williamstown's early settlers. The house was listed on the National Register of Historic Places in 1983, and now houses a bed and breakfast.

== Description and history ==
The Benjamin Simonds House is located about 1.5 miles (2.4 km) north of the center of Williamstown, on the west side of Simonds Road (United States Route 7) just north of its crossing of the Hoosic River. It is a 2 1/2-story wood-frame structure, with a gabled roof, central chimney, and clapboarded exterior. Its main facade is five bays wide, with a modestly styled central entrance flanked by pilasters. The interior retains a great deal of original period woodwork, including builtin cabinetry, fireplace mantels, and crown moulding.

Benjamin Simonds was a native of Connecticut who first came to the area that is now Williamstown as a militia soldier stationed at Fort Massachusetts in the 1740s, during King George's War. He first bought land in the area in 1749, eventually moving to this area, where he built this house in 1769. He operated a tavern in the town, and was a leading force in the incorporation of Williamstown in 1765, and the founding of Williams College in 1790. He was also active militarily in the American Revolutionary War, where he led a regiment of militia in the Battle of Bennington and other engagements.

== See also ==
- National Register of Historic Places listings in Berkshire County, Massachusetts
