= 1753 House =

House

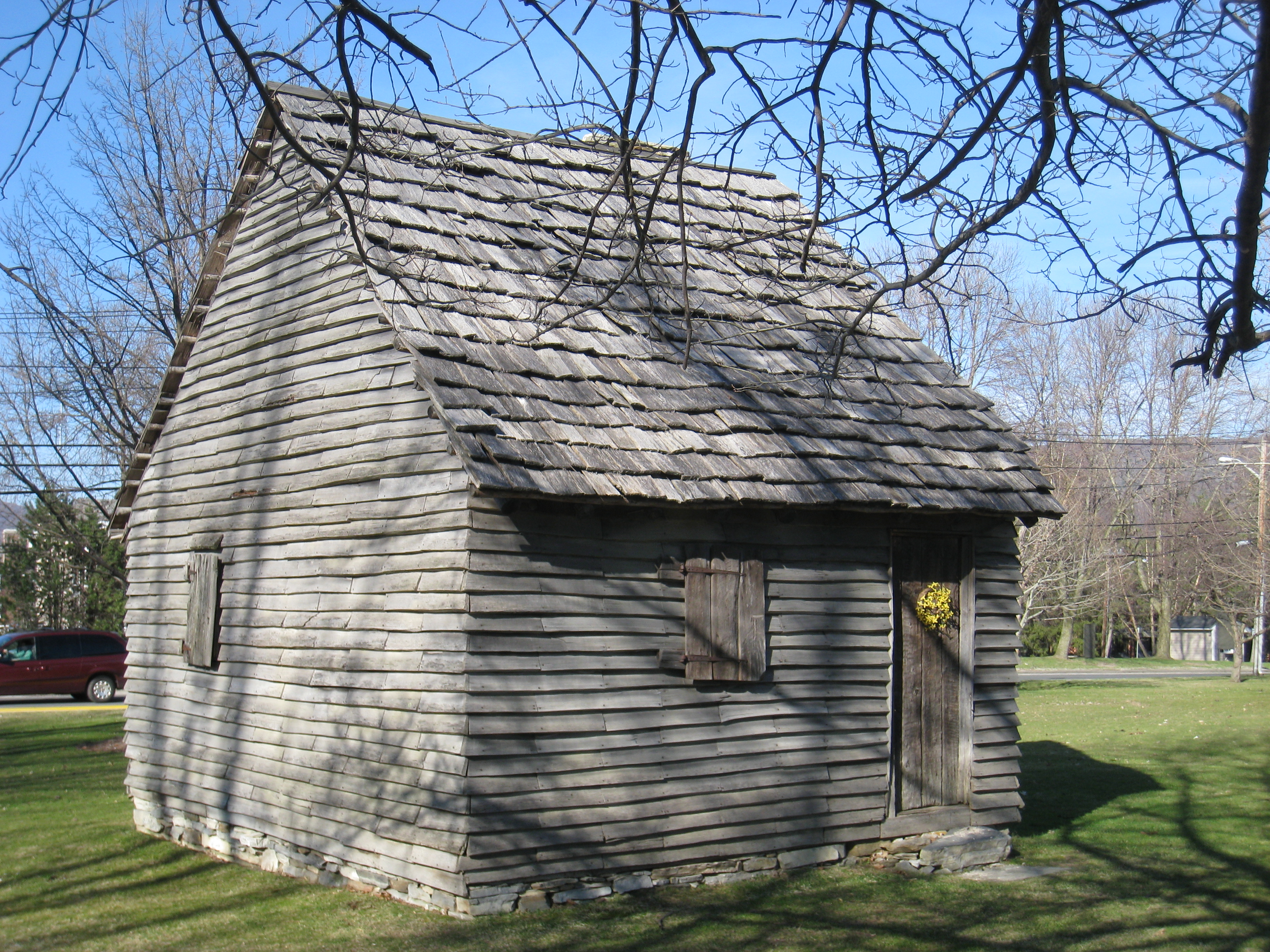
The 1753 House in 2008

The 1753 House is a historical replica of a regulation settler's home in The Berkshires in 1753. Located in Field Park at the west end of Williamstown, Massachusetts, in the center of the roundabout at the intersection of Massachusetts Route 2 and United States Route 7, the house was constructed by volunteers in 1953 in celebration of the town's Bicentennial. Early settlers to the Hoosac Valley, the area now occupied by towns such as Williamstown and North Adams, were required by legal contract to build a house at least 15 by 18 feet and 7 feet high and to clear 5 acres of land to gain a title to their lot.

== History ==
Williamstown, which began as West Hoosac in 1750, is a small Berkshire town located in the northwest corner of Massachusetts. The General Court of Massachusetts Bay Colony, for political, economic, and military reasons, made land plots available for sale in this area. West Hoosac was of particular military importance at this time because it acted as a pathway to Greenfield, Deerfield, and Charlemont eastward as well as towns to the south such as Great Barrington and Stockbridge.

In 1751, 60 lots were put on sale for six pounds, thirteen shillings and fourpence each (2). The buyer was not fully entitled to his land, however, until he cleared 5 acres of land and built a house at least 15 feet wide, 18 feet long, and 7 feet high. This rule gave the buildings the name "regulation houses". Much of the land was purchased by soldiers at nearby Fort Massachusetts, including Captain Ephraim Williams, Jr., the benefactor of Williams College.

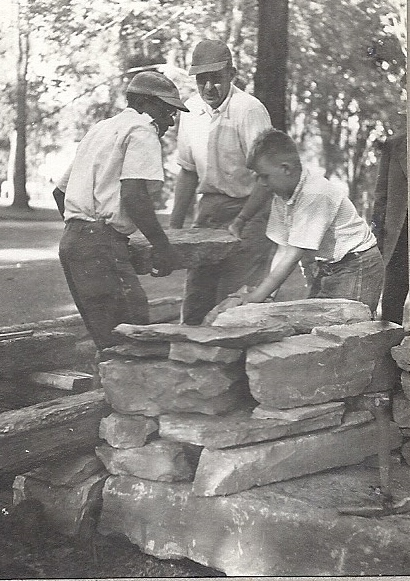
The house under construction in 1953

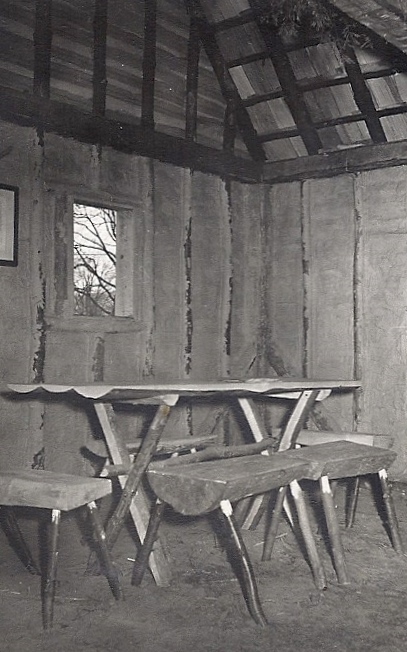
The interior of the house

== Construction ==
The 1753 House was built only with materials, tools, and methods that would have been used in 1753. The house was originally erected in Field Park but was relocated to its current location in 1996. The 1753 House closed in 2010 due to chimney damage, but reopened in November 2012 with a ceremonial fire lighting in the new chimney.

The House was originally intended as a temporary exhibit, but it has remained a Williamstown landmark due to its popularity.

== Appearance ==
Built with regulation dimensions, the 1753 House is quite small by modern standards. Using mortise and tenon joints, the walls and frame are made of oak timbers harvested from nearby White Oak woods. The roof uses split shingling. The interior includes a few historical replicas, such as a table, a bench, and fireplace cooking instruments. A loft covered in pine branches, about 7 feet above the dirt floor, provides a sleeping area closer to the chimney, which emanates heat. A large stone chimney serves as the central focal point of the building.

== Uses ==
The 1753 House is a popular destination for locals and tourists alike. Although it is not open everyday as it once was, it hosts a variety of special events and visits from school groups. The House provides an interactive educational experience for students to understand the living conditions of early settlers in their own town. The House can also be reserved for personal use. Past uses have included a campout by Boy Scouts and a hearth-cooking demonstration by a high school student.
