= Fort Dummer =

First permanent European settlement in Vermont

Fort Dummer State Park
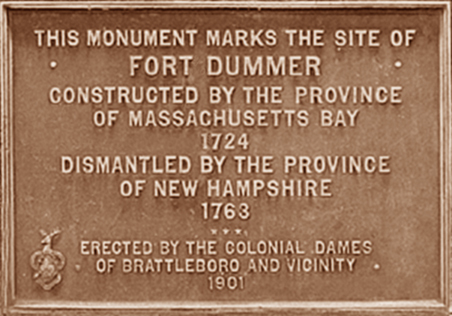
- Fort Dummer Monument

- Location within Vermont
- Interactive map of Fort Dummer State Park
- Location: Brattleboro, Vermont, United States
- Coordinates: 42°49′29″N 72°34′00″W
- Area: 217 acres (88 ha)
- Administrator: Vermont Department of Forests, Parks, and Recreation
- Website: Official website
- Vermont State Parks

Fort Dummer was built in the winter of 1724 in what is now the Town of Brattleboro in southeastern Vermont. Today, it is notable as the first permanent European settlement in Vermont. The original site of the fort is now lost below the waters of the Connecticut River impoundment of the Vernon Dam.

== History ==
=== Greylock's War ===
Fort Dummer was a British colonial fort built in 1723 during Dummer's War by the militia of the Province of Massachusetts Bay under the command of Lieutenant Timothy Dwight in what is now the Town of Brattleboro, in southeastern Vermont. At the time of construction, the fort was built on territory administered by Massachusetts. This was in the heart of one of the three main sections of the Equivalent Lands.

The fort was the first permanent European settlement in Vermont. It consisted of a 180-square foot (17 m²) wooden stockade with 12 guns manned by 55 men (43 Massachusetts militiamen and 12 Mohawk warriors). It was named after Lieutenant Governor William Dummer, who was acting governor of Massachusetts at the time of the fort's construction.

In June 1724, Chief Gray Lock was seen in the vicinity of Fort Dummer with 40 Indians, though no attack was made by them or the soldiers.

On October 11, 1724, seventy Abenakis led by Greylock attacked Fort Dummer and killed 3 or 4 militiamen in the only known military action involving the stockade.

In the spring of 1725, six men stationed at Fort Dummer were ambushed while on scouting duty and only one escaped. This is suspected to be the last military action of Dummer's War in Vermont.

=== Peace Time ===
After the war, Fort Dummer was expanded and turned into a trading post. Staff included members of the Scaticook and Caughnawaga tribes. In 1737, the fort was the site of the signing of a peace treaty between the Caughnawaga Indians and the Province of Massachusetts Bay. Three years later, command of the fort fell to Captain Josiah Willard of Winchester.

In 1740, the border of Massachusetts and New Hampshire was settled and the fort and the territory and towns surrounding it were granted to New Hampshire. Massachusetts Governor William Shirley wrote to Secretary of State Lord Newcastle that Massachusetts would continue to man the fort if New Hampshire would pay for it. New Hampshire Governor Benning Wentworth refused, knowing Massachusetts would continue to fund such an important piece of defense.

=== King George's War ===
King George's War (1744-1748) brought new attention to the fort. Along with Fort at Number 4 and Fort Massachusetts, Fort Dummer was manned throughout the war. It was the base of operations for many raids against the Indians.

=== French and Indian War ===
During the French and Indian War, Fort Dummer was generally undermanned due to troop requirements elsewhere. In the year of 1755, 19 people were killed or captured within a 2-mile radius of the fort. However, New Hampshire started funding the fort.

After the Conquest of Quebec, the threat of Indian attacks, which were partially sponsored by the French, went away. With the signing of the Treaty of Paris, New Hampshire finally abandoned Fort Dummer.

Near the former site of the fort is a granite monument, which is one mile (2 km) south of the Brattleboro railway station.

== Attempted reconstruction ==
In the 1950s, the Vermont Historic Sites Commission proposed a Fort Dummer State Park. In 1957, the Commission recommended that the state fund a historically accurate reconstruction of the fort to the Vermont Legislature. It was not approved because other recommended historic sites had not brought in the anticipated tourist money. However, the Commission received a donation of land from the Bushnell family for use for the project. That land was eventually used for the Fort Dummer State Park campgrounds instead.

== Fort Dummer State Park ==
Fort Dummer State Park is part of the Vermont State Park system. It comprises 217 acres (878,000 m²) of forest in Brattleboro, Guilford & Vernon.

The park overlooks the former site of Fort Dummer which was flooded when the Vernon Dam was built on the Connecticut River in 1908. The granite monument that commemorates the fort is not within the borders of the park. The monument itself was moved in 1908 to prevent it from being lost after the dam was completed. The original site of the fort can be seen from the northernmost scenic vista on the Sunrise Trail within the park. It is now underwater near the lumber company located on the western bank of the river.

Campground facilities include 50 tent/trailer sites and 10 lean-to sites, toilet buildings with hot showers, and a sanitary dump station. Other facilities include a small picnic area, three short hiking trails, one of which leads to a swimming hole, and a large open field.

== See also ==
- Fort at Number 4
- Fort Massachusetts (Massachusetts)
