= William Jennys =

American painter

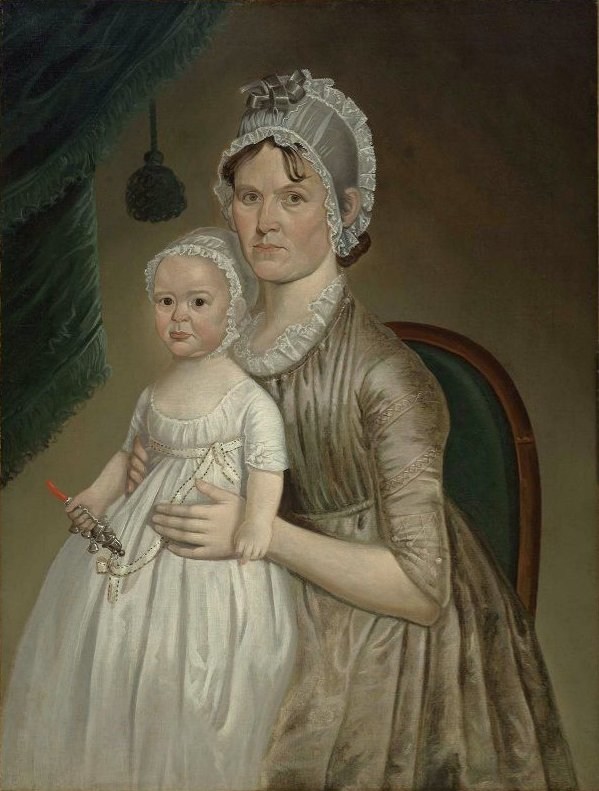
Mrs. Cephas Smith, Jr. (Mary Gove) and Child, by William Jennys, oil on canvas, c. 1803, Museum of Fine Arts, Boston

William Jennys (1774–1859), also known as J. William Jennys, was an American primitive portrait painter who was active from about 1790 to 1810. He traveled throughout New England seeking commissions in rural areas and small towns. He was the son of the self-taught itinerant portrait painter Richard Jennys (1735–1809), and was trained by and traveled with his father from about 1792 to 1808

His early works are characterized by broadly modeled faces with a minimum of costume detail and bare backgrounds. Both the costumes and backgrounds became more detailed as his career progressed. The Connecticut Historical Society (Hartford, Connecticut), Currier Museum of Art (Manchester, New Hampshire), the Cushing House Museum and Garden (Newburyport, MA), the Farnsworth Art Museum (Rockland, Maine), the Lyman Allyn Art Museum (New London, Connecticut), the Honolulu Museum of Art, the Metropolitan Museum of Art (New York City), the Minneapolis Institute of Arts, the Museum of Fine Arts, Boston, the National Gallery of Art (Washington D.C.), the Rockefeller Folk Art Collection (Colonial Williamsburg) the Utah Museum of Fine Arts (Salt Lake City), the Museum of Arts and Sciences (Daytona Beach) and Wake Forest University Fine Arts Gallery (Winston-Salem, North Carolina), are among the public collections holding work by William Jennys.

== Gallery ==
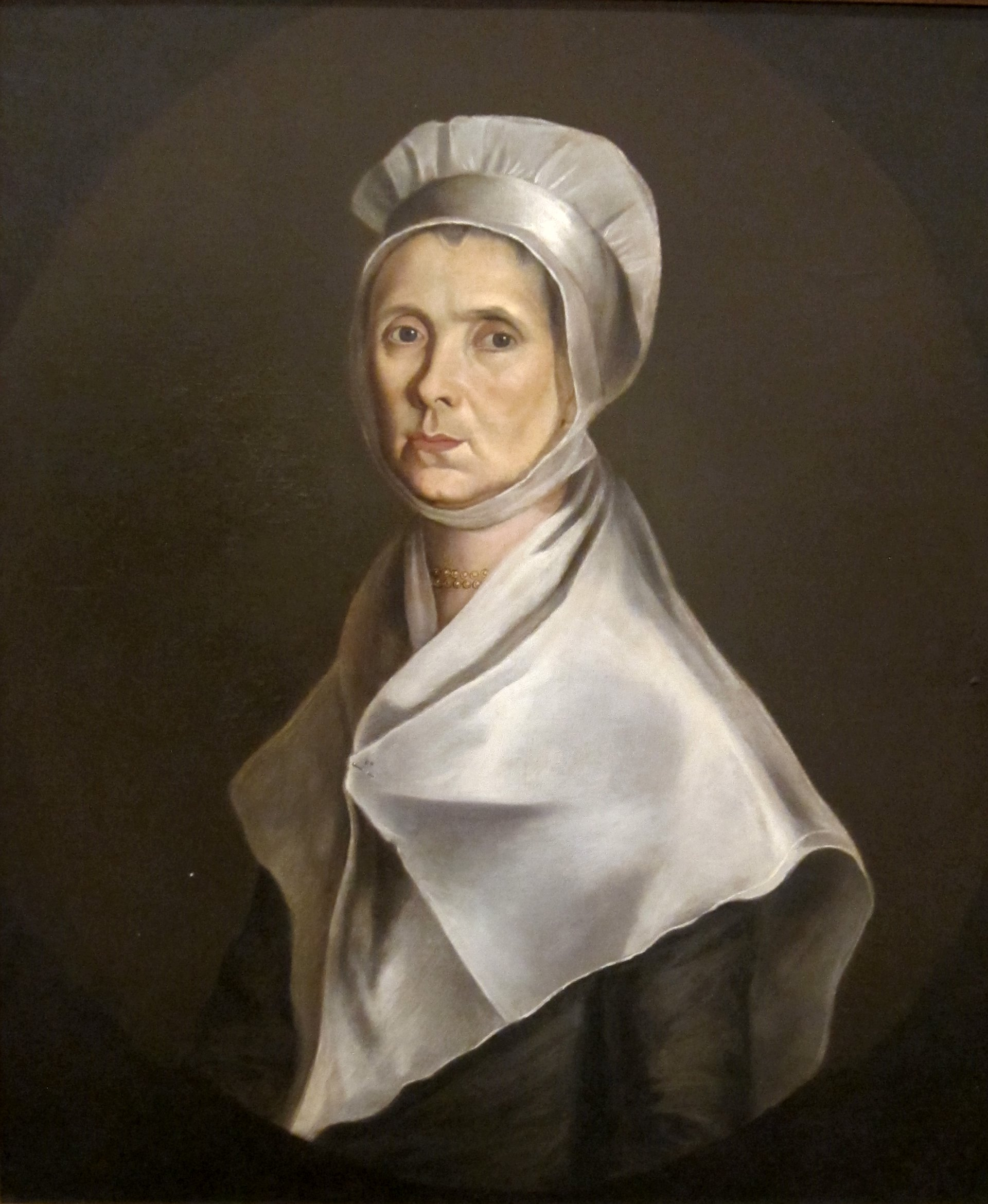
Portrait of Mrs. Cooke by William Jennys, oil on panel, Honolulu Museum of Art

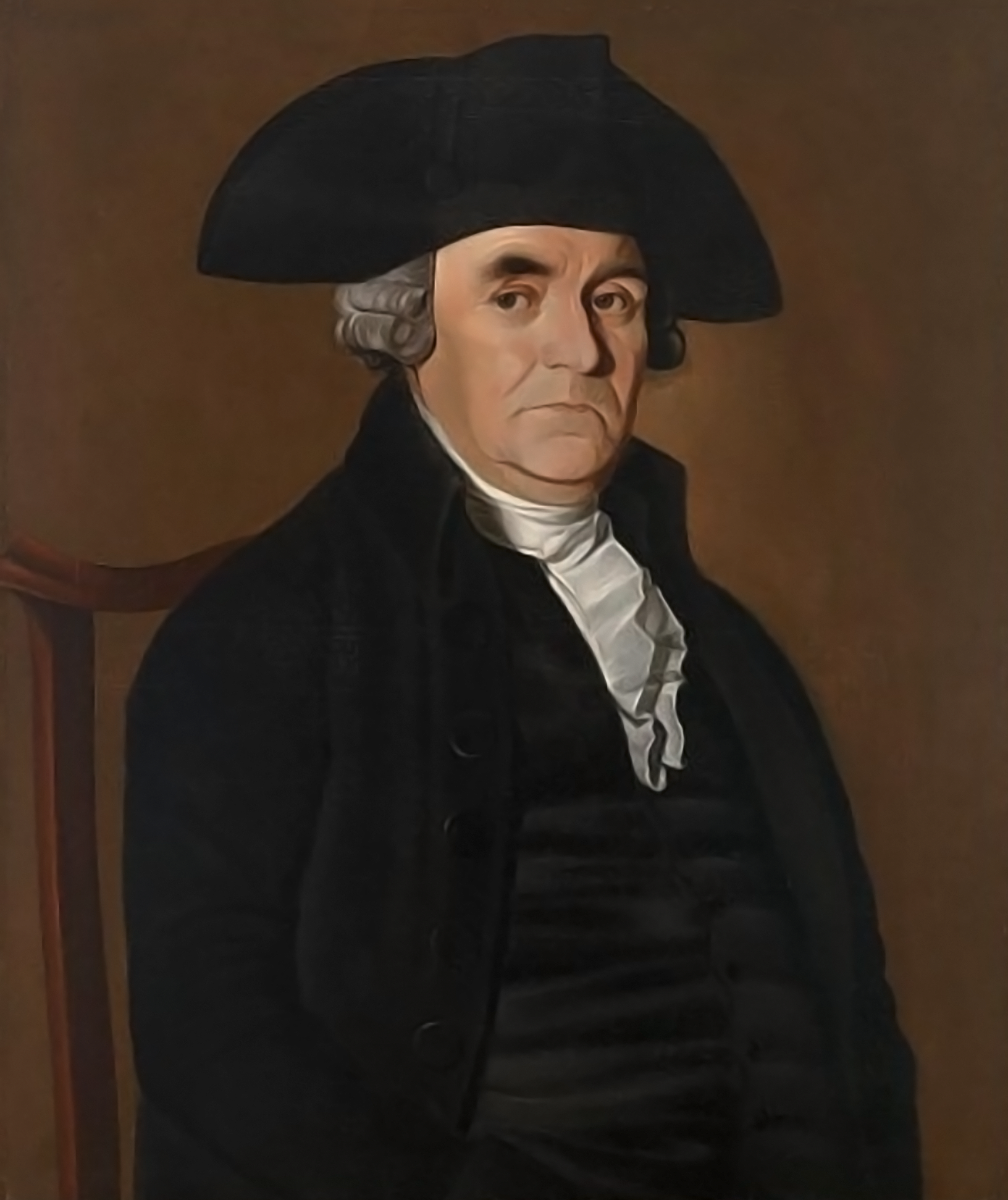
Portrait of Col. Benjamin Simonds by William Jennys

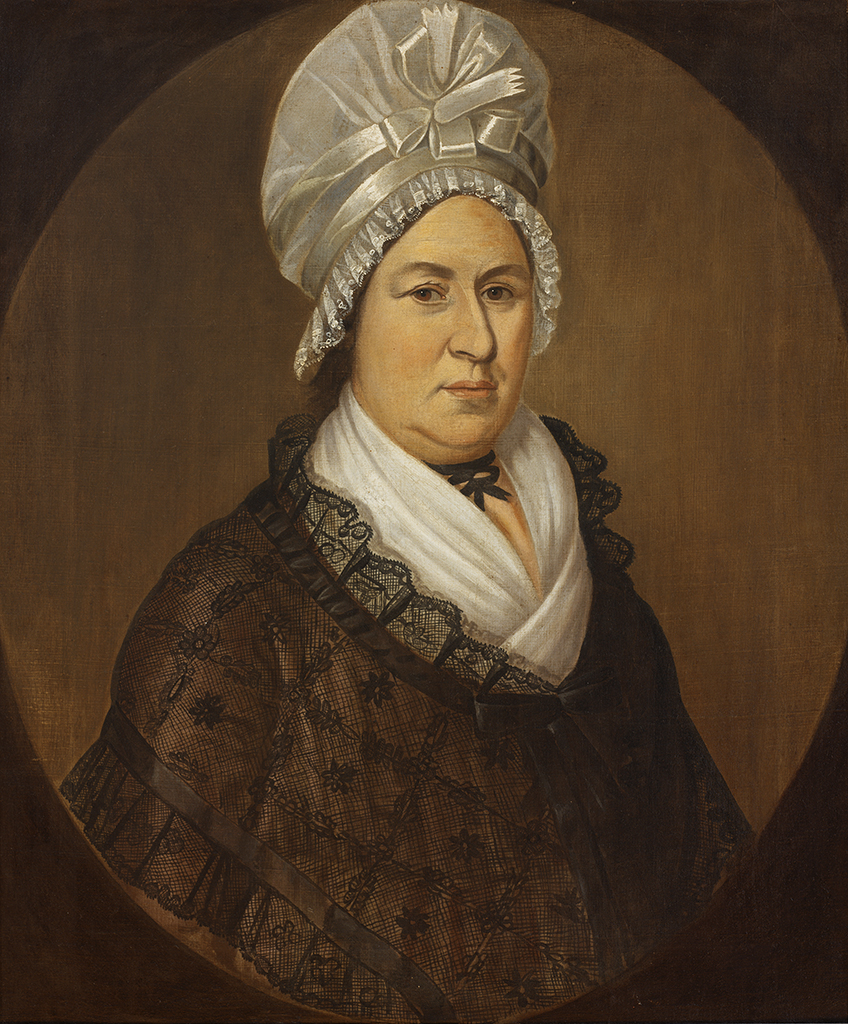
William Jennys - Portrait of Mrs. Israel Ashley - 2002.97.4 - Rhode Island School of Design Museum

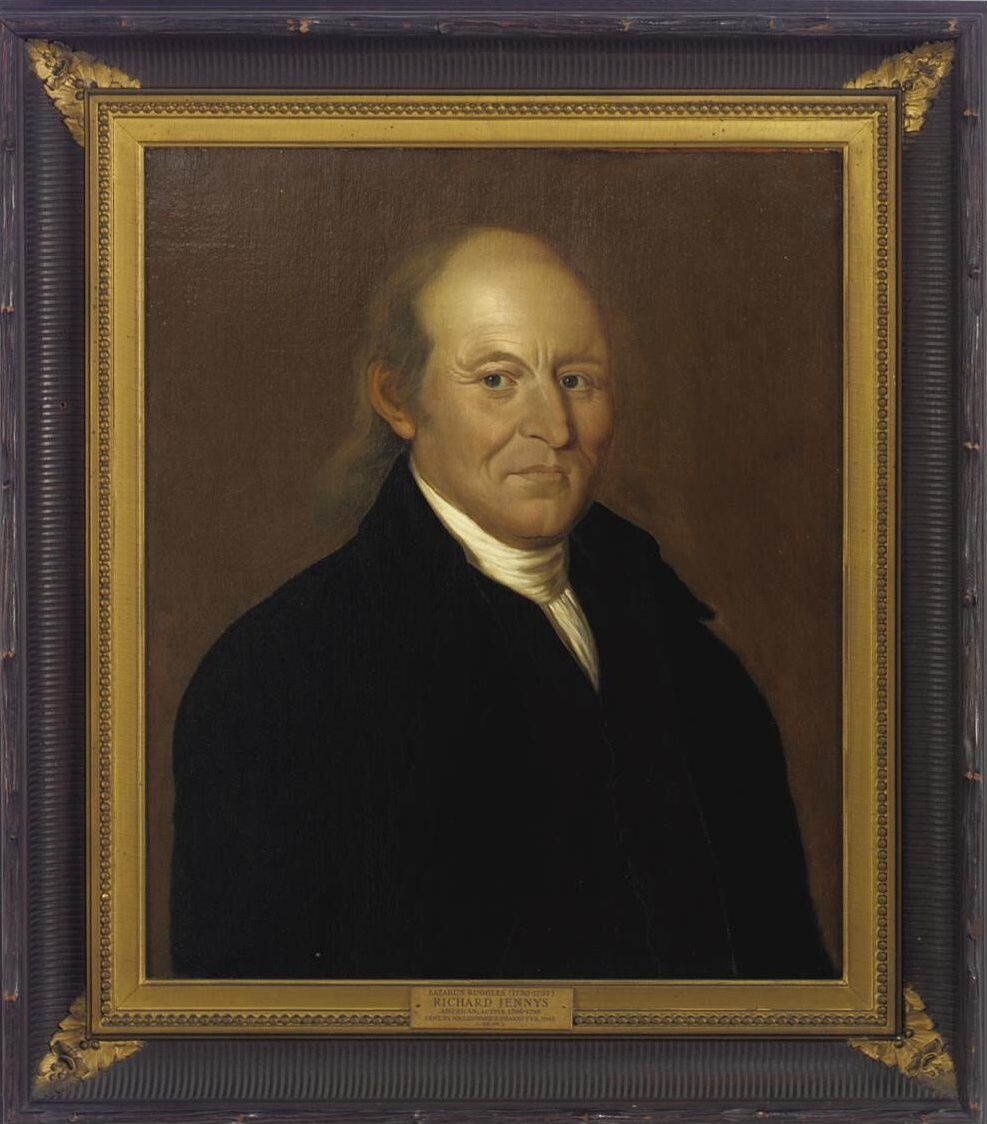
Portrait of captain Lazarus Ruggles

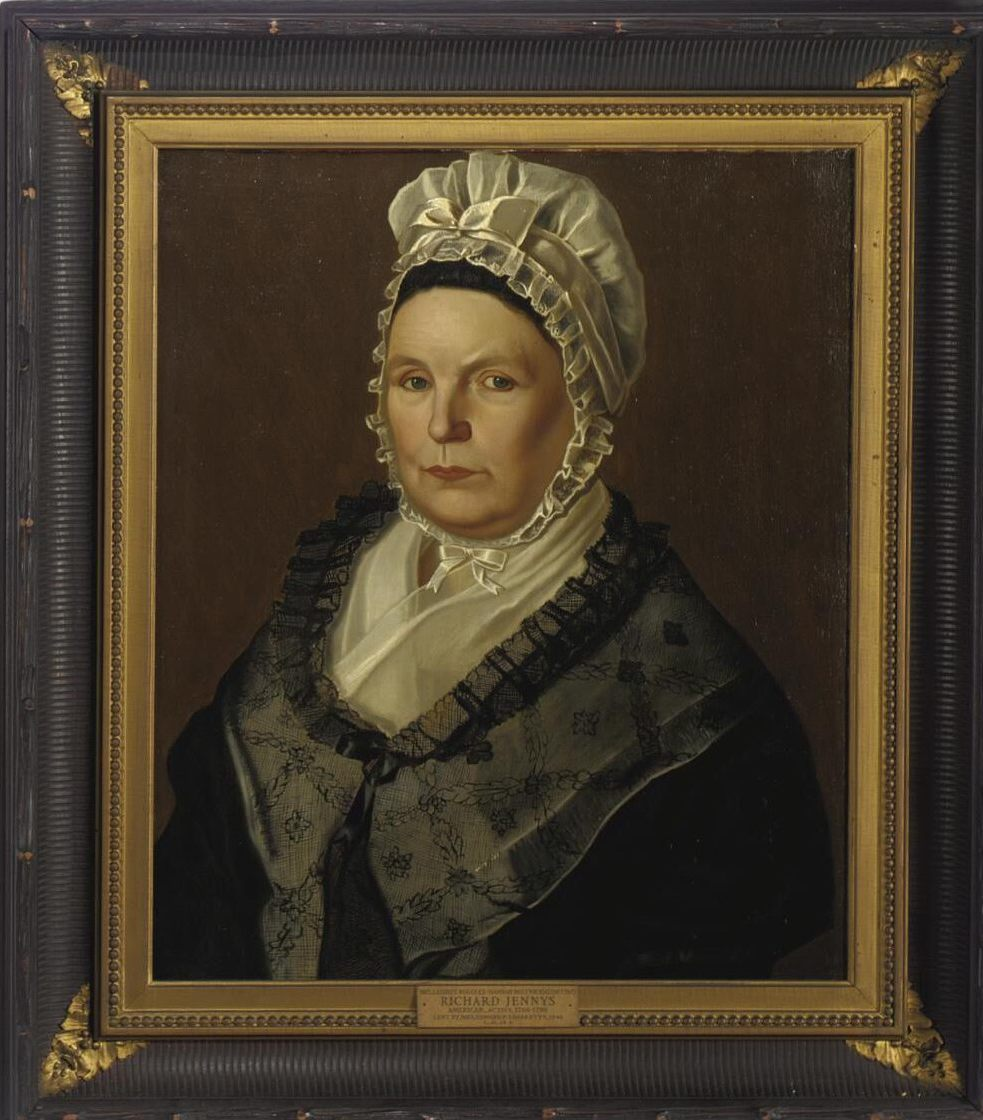
Portrait of Hannah Bostwick Ruggles

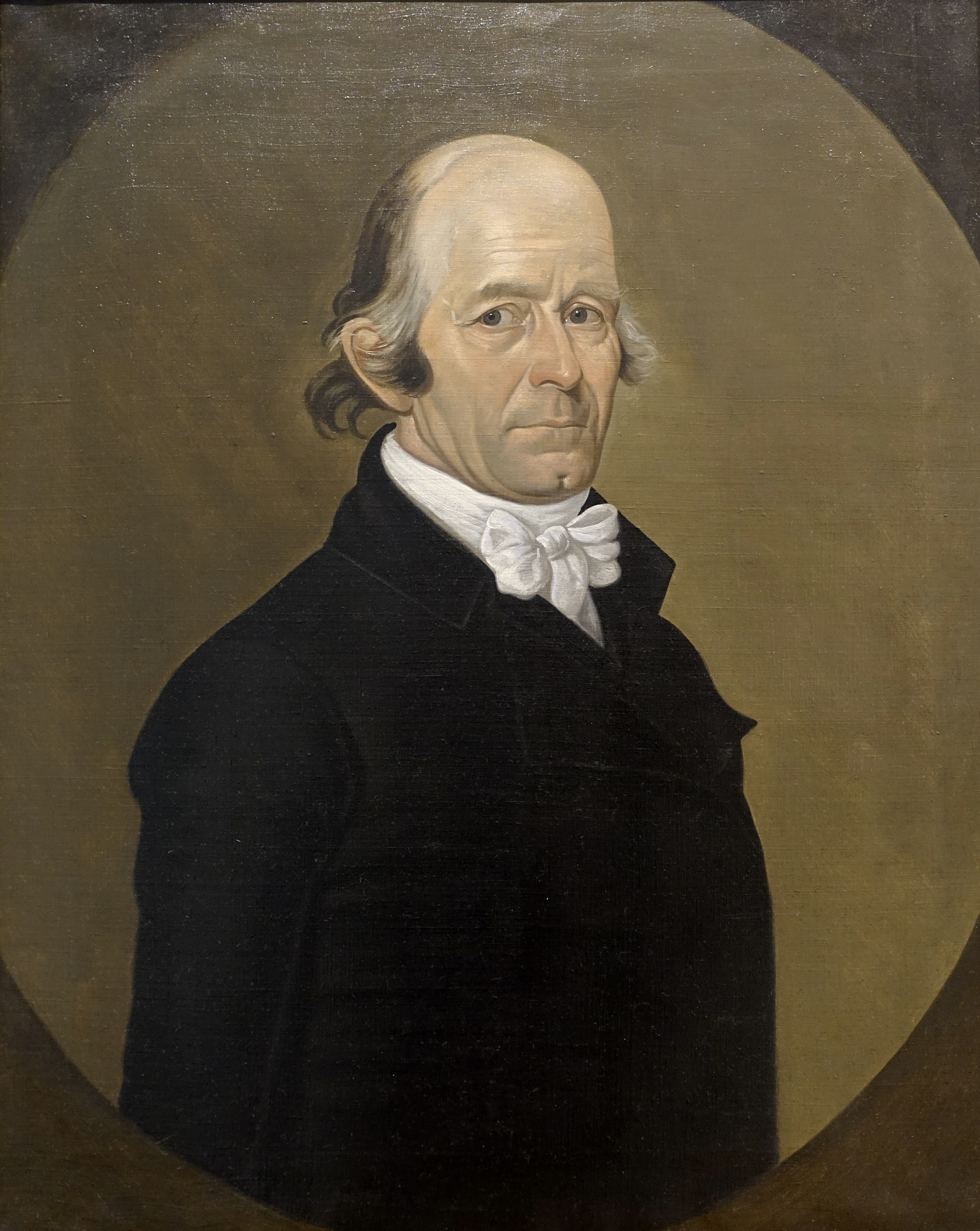
Portrait of Governor Paul Brigham of Vermont
