= Burke's Rangers =

- Active: 1747–1762
- Country: Great Britain
- Allegiance: British Crown
- Branch: Provincial troops: Rangers
- Type: Reconnaissance, Light Infantry
- Role: Reconnaissance, Light Infantry
- Size: One company
- Garrison/HQ: Fort William Henry
- Engagements: King George's War French and Indian War: Crown Point Expedition (1755); Battle of Lake George (1755); Siege of Fort William Henry (1757); Fort William Henry (1757); Battle of Carillon (1758); Battle of Ticonderoga (1759)

Commanders
- Notable commanders: John Burke

The Burke's Rangers was a company of provincial volunteers organized and led by Major John Burke in Massachusetts just before the French and Indian War. Burke was widely noted for his skill and daring in Indian warfare, and frequently served in campaigns against the Indians. Burke was initially commissioned as an ensign by Governor William Shirley and subsequently commissioned a lieutenant, then a captain. Toward the close of the French and Indian war, in 1760, he was commissioned a major by Governor Thomas Pownall.

== Background ==
Upon the conclusion of King Philip's War the Massachusetts provincial government sought to defend its borders by settling groups of veterans on lands captured during the war. This was seen as an inexpensive deterrent to continued hostilities with French colonists in New France and a way to bolster New England claims to contested border regions.

Bernardston, Massachusetts, initially known as Falls Fight Township, was a frontier settlement created by and for the families of soldiers who had fought in King Philip's War, specifically in the Battle of Turner's Falls, which was a major engagement fought under Captain William Turner in 1676. John Burke was an early settler of the town, arriving with his father who was one of the veterans granted land in Falls Fight.

In November 1734, the following was presented to the General Court of Massachusetts:

A petition of Samuel Hunt, of Billerica, for himself and other survivors of the officers and soldiers that belonged to the company of Capt. Turner, and the representatives of them that are dead, shewing that the said company in 1676 engaged the Indian enemy at a place above Deerfield, and destroyed above three hundred of them, and, therefore, praying that this court would grant them a tract of land above Deerfield suitable to make a township.

The petition was granted and the proprietors of the new township began recruiting 60 families to settle in the town. John Burke, Samuel Connable, Lieutenant Ebenezer Sheldon, and his son Deacon Ebenezer Sheldon, built the first four houses, in 1738. They were made of hewn logs, with port-holes in the walls for defense against the Indians.

== Pre-war period ==
At his own expense, Burke built a stockade fort that stood "six rods on each side" (equivalent to about 100 feet). The stockade walls stood 12 feet high behind which the inhabitants repaired every night during the periods of intercultural frontier violence. The fort contained eight homes, protecting the settlement during attacks beginning in 1745 and later the French and Indian War.

The stockade was located on the traditional lands of the Wabanaki Confederacy, and in 1746, members of the confederacy attacked the fort in an effort to drive out the New England colonists. Although there were only two men in the fort besides Burke, the Indian raiders were driven off. At about the same time a band of Indians attempted to destroy Deacon Ebenezer Sheldon's house on Huckle Hill, but were repulsed by his father Lieutenant Ebenezer Sheldon, who appeared on the scene with aid just in time.The following year, Eliakim Sheldon, son of Lieutenant Ebenezer Sheldon, was shot while he was walking near his father's house. Lieutenant Sheldon was famous for his violent inclinations towards Native Americans, earning him the sobriquet the "Old Indian-Hunter".

On March 1, 1747, Burke was commissioned an ensign in a company of volunteers raised for the defense of the frontier under order of the Royal Governor of Massachusetts William Shirley who played a prominent role in the defense of the American colonies during the war. Burke's volunteers later began playing a defensive role in the Deerfield–Falltown region.

== French and Indian War ==
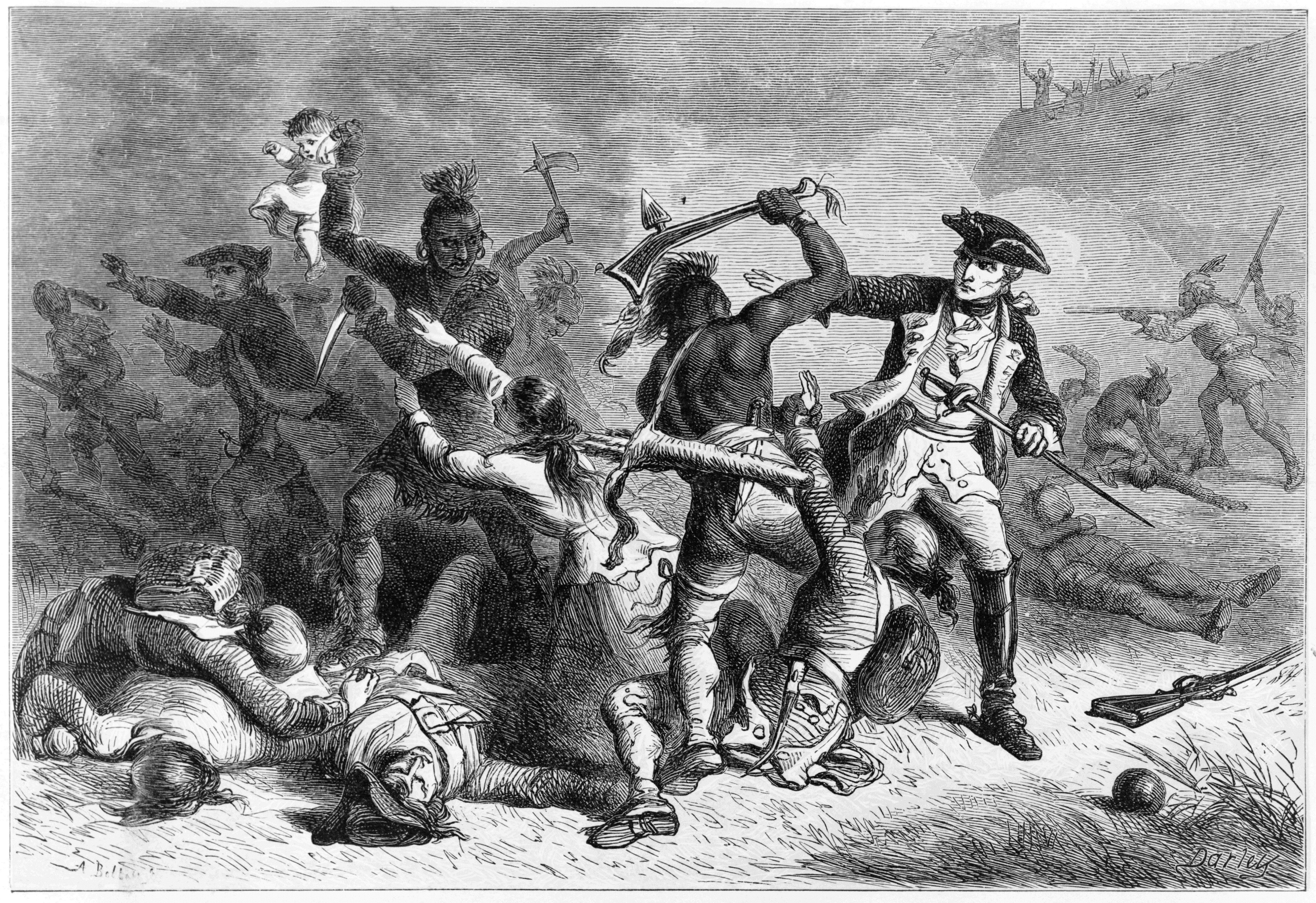
Montcalm trying to stop Native Americans from attacking British soldiers and civilians as they leave Fort William Henry. Wood engraving by Alfred Bobbett after a painting of Felix Octavius Carr Darley. Published between 1870 and 1880.

Burke and his company played an active role in the French and Indian War of 1755. During the fighting, the people of Falls Fight township suffered greatly as a result of the town being established on land still claimed by the Wabanaki Confederacy. Indians attacked the town. A number of colonial families moved from the frontier community to the safety of larger colonial towns. The militia from the township, led by then Ensign Burke, was called to service.

=== Establishment of the "Rangers" ===
In 1757, Massachusetts began to pursue a policy of raising and deploying its forces on an ongoing basis each year, without waiting for requests of defenseless towns and almost abandoned garrisons. In addition to the colony's garrison troops,"one hundred men were employed on the eastern frontier, and forty-five under a captain and lieutenant, on the west side of the Connecticut River, to Range the woods north of Falltown." The latter company—known as Rangers—under the command of Captain John Burke, was stationed at Hinsdale's Fort, on the east bank of the Connecticut River. Burke began recruiting his company in the winter of 1756. The initial group of forty-five men included four Stockbridge Mahicans. Burke received his captain's commission on March 30, by which time he had seventy men enrolled in his company. They made frequent marches through the neighboring country for the purpose of discovering concealed Indians. Their course was sometimes along the main stream of West River, and again by its south or west branches. They frequently ascended to the top of West River Mountain to watch for the smoke of the enemy's camp fires. To enable them perform their difficult tasks, snow-shoes and moccasins were issued to the Rangers.

In the winter of 1756–57, the Rangers under Burke were stationed at the fort at Hinsdale, Massachusetts. There were no enemy attacks on the fort and by summer they had been posted to Fort William Henry.

=== Crown Point Expedition ===
On April 11, 1755, Colonel Ephraim Williams of Deerfield sent a letter to John Burke offering him the position of captain-lieutenant in his regiment and requesting men for the expedition against Crown Point. He desired that "only good men be enlisted" and asked that the names of the men selected be sent immediately.

Marching north into French territory, in August 1755 the overall commander of the British forces, William Johnson, renamed Lac du Saint-Sacrement to Lake George in honor of his king. On 8 September 1755, Johnson's forces held their ground in the Battle of Lake George. Johnson was wounded by a ball that was to remain in his hip or thigh for the rest of his life. Hendrick Theyanoguin, Johnson's Mohawk ally, was killed in the battle, and Baron Dieskau, the French commander, was captured.

Among the inhabitants of Bernardston who joined Burke's Rangers were Caleb Chapin and his two sons, Joel and Hezekiah. They were with Williams at the Battle of Lake George in September 1755, where Caleb Chapin was killed. He was wounded in the thick of battle while fighting by the side of his sons, and when he fell they sought to carry him away, but he commanded them to save themselves and leave him to die. They left him accordingly where he fell, and when, after the fight, they returned in search of him, they found him dead, with a tomahawk buried in his brain. This tomahawk is still preserved in the cabinet of the American Antiquarian Society at Worcester. Williams was killed in the battle as well, his body was hidden in the woods by the survivors to save it from desecration.

The battle brought an end to the expedition against Crown Point, and the soldiers built Fort William Henry at Lake George to strengthen the defenses there.

In 1757, Jonathan Carver, later explorer of the Upper Great Lakes and friend of Robert Rogers, enlisted in Burke's Rangers. He became a lieutenant in Burke's company.

Burke was at the surrender of Fort William Henry in August 1757, his company formed part of Colonel Frye's provincial regiment. According to local lore, he survived the subsequent massacre with only his breeches and his silver watch.

== Disbandment ==
In 1758, as Rogers' Rangers expanded from a company to a corps of 1,500 men, many provincial soldiers, including some from Burke's company joined Roger's Rangers. In April 1758, Major Rogers commissioned a former corporal from Burke's company, Joseph Wait, after he had fought with distinction in the Battle on Snowshoes in March. Wait later became a captain in the corps.

By 1762, Burke's Rangers had been disbanded. In the post war period, Burke continued to play an important role in the affairs of Bernardston. In 1763, he established a tavern in the center of the town, just south of where Weatherhead's saw-mill stood. The sign which used to swing in front of Burke's tavern is still preserved among the relics owned by Memorial Hall Museum which is run by the Pocumtuck Valley Memorial Association at Deerfield, Massachusetts.

== See also ==
- French and Indian Wars (article includes King William's War, Queen Anne's War, King George's War, and this war.)
- Northwest Indian War
- Franco-Indian alliance
- Great Britain in the Seven Years' War
- American Indian Wars
