= Equivalent Lands =

Land exchanged between the Massachusetts Bay and Connecticut colonies

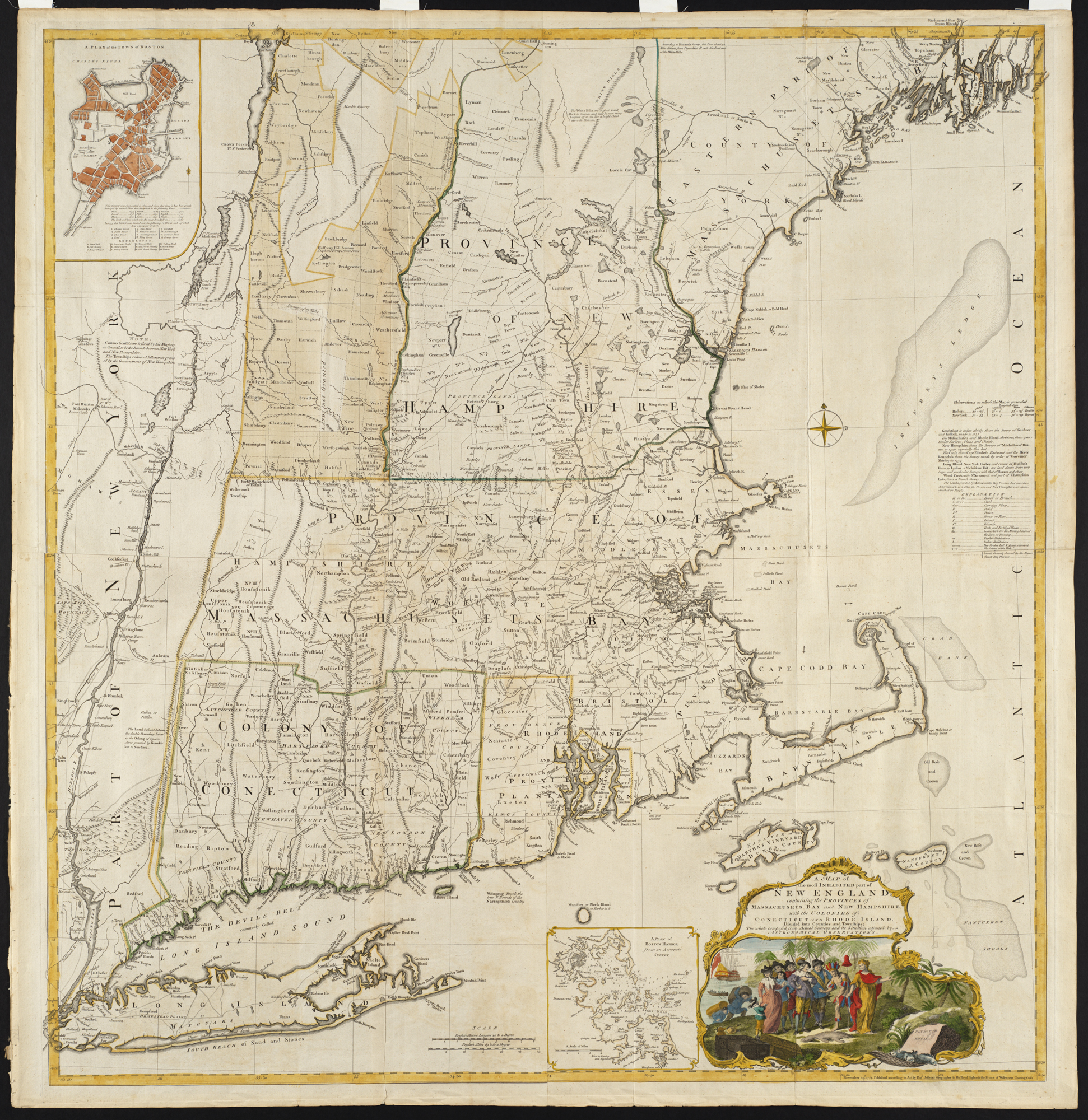
Map of New England showing much of the affected areas circa 1755

The Equivalent Lands were several large tracts of land that the Province of Massachusetts Bay made available to settlers from the Connecticut Colony after April 1716. This was done as compensation for an equivalent area of territory that was under Connecticut's jurisdiction but had been inadvertently settled by citizens of Massachusetts. The problem had arisen due to errors and imprecise surveys made earlier in the seventeenth century. The Equivalent Lands were never mapped.

== Background ==
Settlers in Springfield, Massachusetts, had several disagreements with settlers from Hartford, Connecticut, during the late 1630s when the Connecticut Colony was just getting established. The Springfield settlers decided to align themselves with the Massachusetts Bay Colony instead of Connecticut. As a result, Massachusetts Bay surveyed the border between Massachusetts and Connecticut in 1642, and took control of land as far south as Warehouse Point at Windsor Locks, Connecticut, the northernmost point on the Connecticut River controlled by the tides.

In the 1690s, Connecticut Colony officials performed their own survey and discovered errors that were made in Massachusetts's 1642 survey, but it was not until 1713 that the two colonies co-operated to survey correct boundaries. At that time, the surveyors found that Massachusetts Bay had offered Springfield settlers the right to 105,793 acres (428.13 km^{2}) that actually belonged to Connecticut. The settlers had established themselves in and around the towns of Springfield, Westfield, Suffield, and other areas west of the Connecticut River and believed themselves to be in lands belonging to Massachusetts Bay. Most of those inhabiting the area did not want to change jurisdiction from Massachusetts to Connecticut, so they agreed that Massachusetts would retain administration over the settled lands. In return, Connecticut would be granted property rights (but not sovereignty) for an equal number of acres within Massachusetts, "as an equivalent to the said colony". Connecticut began to auction off the "Equivalent Lands" in 1716, using most of the proceeds to fund the establishment of Yale College.

== Settlement and further development ==
The surveys laying out the new tracts were concluded on November 10, 1715. One tract was in the area around Pelham and Hadley, another in the area encompassing Putney, Brattleboro, and Dummerston, and another along the east side of the Connecticut River. The commissioners appointed to locate these lands were Massachusetts Governor Joseph Dudley; Connecticut Governor Gurdon Saltonstall; Massachusetts residents Elisha Hutchinson and Isaac Addington; and Connecticut residents William Pitkin and William Whiting. These tracts, known as the Equivalent Lands, were then made available for purchase at Hartford on April 24–25, 1716, with the proceeds going to establish Yale. These auctioned lands were grouped in at least three known parcels; however, since there are no extant maps of the Equivalent Lands, there may have been additional areas not auctioned at that time.

One group of land speculators purchased a 44,000-acre (180 km^{2}) parcel. This group included William Brattle, Jr. for whom Brattleboro, Vermont was named. Other initial purchasers of the lands included Paul Dudley, Thomas Fitch III, and Jonathan Belcher.

=== Founding of Brattleboro ===
The Massachusetts General Court voted on December 27, 1723 to build a blockhouse and stockade north of its Northfield settlement in order to defend the Province of Massachusetts Bay against Chief Gray Lock and others during Dummer's War. Lieutenant-governor William Dummer signed the measure, and construction of Fort Dummer began on February 3, 1724. It was completed before summer, and a force of about 70 Native Americans, of the French-allied Abenaki tribe, attacked it on October 11, killing three or four defenders. The settlement surrounding the fort was called "Brattleborough".

The fort was converted into a trading post in 1728 for commerce with friendly Indians. It was once again manned by soldiers during King George's War from 1744 to 1748. A small body of troops remained at the fort until 1750, after which it was considered unnecessary. Brattleborough itself was only scarcely populated until after the 1763 Treaty of Paris, when France abandoned its attempts to colonize North America.

=== Other settlements ===
The Ashuelot Valley towns of Upper Ashuelot and Arlington were established prior to 1740, with several families living in each of the settlements. Richard Hazzen was sent to survey the area in the winter of 1740–41 to try to determine the boundary line between New Hampshire and Massachusetts Bay Colony.

Some settlements in the Equivalent Lands were temporarily abandoned in the mid- to late-1740s due to renewed conflicts with the French and their allied tribes. These areas around Fort Dummer at the time were regarded to be in the New Hampshire colony, although maintenance and protection of the settlements were paid for by Massachusetts Bay. Therefore, another survey team was sent out in 1749, to once again clarify provincial lines, resulting in the New Hampshire Grants and the subsequent territorial disputes with the New York Colony concerning jurisdiction over parts of the area and its inhabitants.

In 1752, a large section of the area came under the dominion of the Province of New Hampshire, but eventually fell under Vermont jurisdiction.

The Equivalent Lands encompass parts of what are now Vermont, New Hampshire, Connecticut, and Massachusetts.
