= Fort Massachusetts (Massachusetts) =

Coordinates: 42.7008°N 73.1092°W

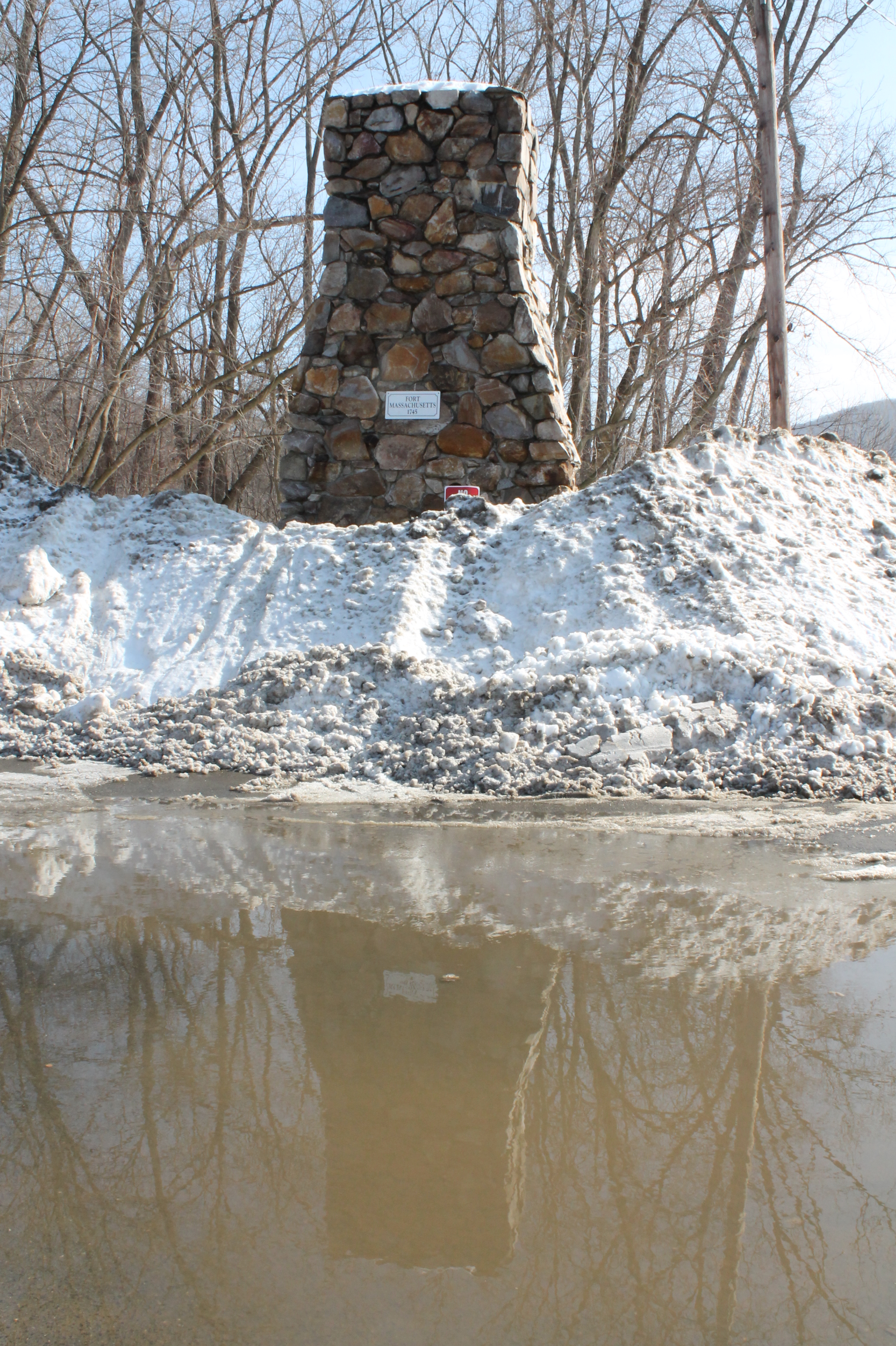
The remains of Fort Massachusetts

Fort Massachusetts was the westernmost in a line of forts built by British colonists to protect the northern border of Massachusetts from French and Indian forces in 1745. It was constructed along the banks of the Hoosac River in what is currently North Adams, Massachusetts by a company of Massachusetts militiamen led by Captain Ephraim Williams. It consisted of a wooden stockade with a guard tower at each corner and a central blockhouse which was designed to be defensible if the walls were breached.

== King George's War ==
In 1746, the fort was the site of the Siege of Fort Massachusetts, a battle in King George's War between the 21 militiamen garrisoning the fort and almost a thousand French soldiers and their Indian allies that resulted in the burning of the fort and the capture of the garrison and their families. The twenty-nine captives were taken to Quebec to be later exchanged as prisoners of war; only fourteen, ten men and four children, lived to be traded back to the British colonies a year later. The Reverend John Norton was among those who returned alive and he published a captivity narrative of the events titled "The Redeemed Captive." According to Norton, Captain Williams was away on business and around half the soldiers were ill at the time of the attack. Surrounded by so many forces, it was deemed impossible for a messenger to get through and ride to the fort at Deerfield for reinforcements. The Massachusetts militia held the fort for 36 hours before surrendering to the French captain due to lack of shot and gunpowder. Their terms of surrender were that they should be prisoners of the French only, that children be allowed to remain with their families and that they be exchanged at the first possible opportunity. The first term was not heeded, but in Norton's account, they were not treated with cruelty and Indian troops carried those who were too sick or wounded to walk.

== Later colonial history ==
The Fort was rebuilt under the command of Captain Williams ten months later in June 1747. The watchtowers were fortified with larger guns, but no full-scale attacks occurred for the rest of the fort's history. Troops were reduced after the Treaty of Aix-la-Chapelle in 1748 temporarily brought an end to the threat of a French invasion from Canada. During this period, many of the soldiers who had been garrisoned at the fort turned to farming instead. Under the charter for the nearby new township of West Hoosac (now known as Williamstown, Massachusetts), soldiers and officers had the option to take a 190-acre package of land in lieu of back-pay. They eventually became influential and respected founding members of Williamstown.

Fort Massachusetts was re-fortified at the outbreak of the French and Indian War in 1754, where it served as an important staging point for troops passing through the area. After the war, the fort was abandoned and fell into disrepair.

== Reconstruction and demolition ==
In 1895, the North Adams Women's Club began raising funds to reconstruct the fort as a memorial site. The new fort was dedicated in 1933 and operated as a historical tourist site into the 1960s. It was eventually sold and torn down due to lack of funds and vandalism. The reconstructed chimney and a rock with a commemorative plaque remain on the site, in what is now the parking lot of the former North Adams Price Chopper. The historic site was conveyed to the City of North Adams by the Golub family in 2017.

== See also ==
- Fort Dummer
- Fort at Number 4
