= Ephraim Williams =

American landowner and militia officer (1714-1755)

- Born: March 7, 1715; Newton, Massachusetts Bay
- Died: September 8, 1755 (aged 40); Lake George, Province of New York
- Cause of death: Killed in action
- Occupations: Soldier, land owner
- Known for: Benefactor of Williams College

Ephraim Williams Jr. (March 7, 1715 [O.S. February 24, 1714] – September 8, 1755) was an American landowner and militia officer from the Province of Massachusetts Bay who was killed in the French and Indian War. Born in Newton, Massachusetts, he was the benefactor of Williams College, located in northwestern Massachusetts. The school's athletic programs, the Ephs, are named after Williams.

== Life ==
=== Early life ===
Ephraim Jr. was the eldest son of Ephraim Williams Sr. and Elizabeth Jackson Williams (d. 1718). He was born in Newton, Massachusetts, on February 24, 1715, and was raised by his maternal grandparents after his mother died giving birth to a second son, Thomas, in 1718. His family was influential in western Massachusetts; they were preeminent in a group of families then called the "River Gods" (referencing the Connecticut River, the major waterway in the area). A cousin, Israel Williams, was known as the "monarch of Hampshire" due to his singular influence along the river.

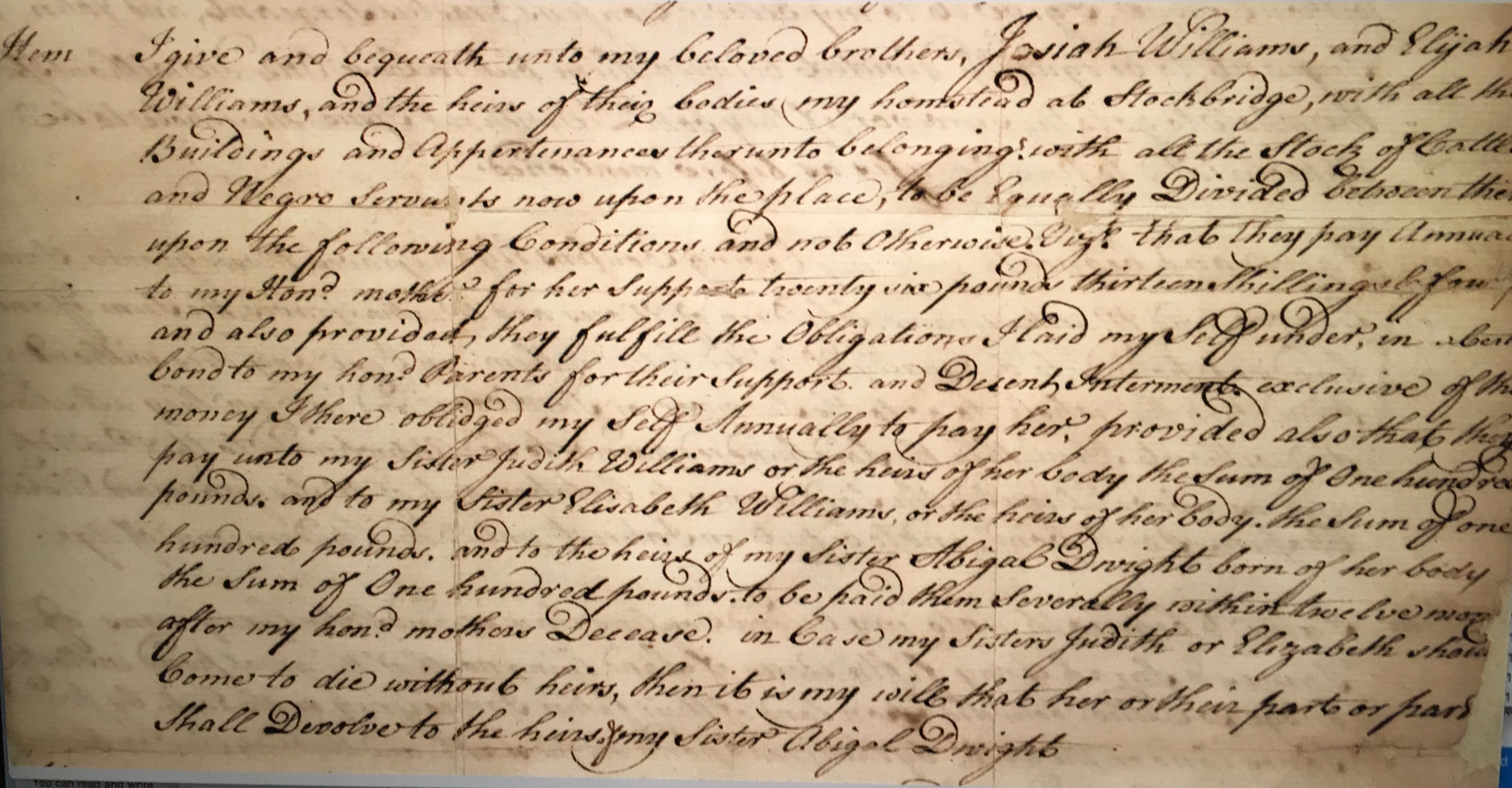
In this section of Ephraim William's Last Will and Testament (1755), Williams allocates his slaves to his brothers Josiah and Elijah Williams. ["I give and bequeath...all the Buildings and Appurtenances therunto belongings with all the stock of Cattle and Negro Servants now upon [his homestead in Stockbridge"]

In his youth, Ephraim Jr. was a sailor and travelled several times to Europe, visiting England, Holland and Spain.

=== Military service ===
In 1742, at age 27, he moved to Stockbridge, Massachusetts, where his father had relocated on land purchased from the Mahican tribe, and purchased large tracts of land in the young settlement. He joined the militia and was commissioned captain.

In 1745 during King George's War (1745–1748), he was put in charge of building and defending Fort Massachusetts and the line of defences in western Connecticut and Massachusetts. He was absent when the fort was taken and destroyed by the French in August 1746. After the war ended, Williams spent considerable effort urging the settlement of new townships in the western portion of Massachusetts along the Hoosac River at the end of the 1740s. Many of the early settlers in this region were soldiers stationed at Fort Massachusetts during the war, including Williams himself.

However, within just a few years, Williams was again called into service as part of the French and Indian War (1754–1763). Williams, now a colonel, took part in William Johnson's expedition against Crown Point, New York, leading a regiment of ten companies. Among those companies were Burke's Rangers and Rogers' Rangers. Among his aides was William Williams from Connecticut, a signer of the Declaration of Independence.

Williams was shot in the head and killed during an ambush by the French and their Indian allies in the Battle of Lake George on September 8, 1755, at the age of 40. Members of his regiment hid his body after the battle to prevent it from being desecrated. They later buried Williams nearby. His body was disinterred in the early 20th century and moved to the chapel at Williams College. A stone etched with Williams' initials on it and the year of his death still stands at the original Lake George gravesite just across the street from a monument erected by Williams College alumni. The monument marks the site of the ambush, which was called the Bloody Morning Scout.

== Legacy ==
Ephraim left his sizeable estate to support the founding of a free school on his land in western Massachusetts, on the conditions that the town be renamed after him (Williamstown, Massachusetts, formerly West Hoosac), that the town be part of the Massachusetts Bay Colony, and that the free school be built on the land which he donated. He previously intended to found the school as an academy for "the Promoting & propogating [sic] Christian knowledge amongst the Indians at Stockbridge" but was deterred by the potential of the project being manipulated by his political rivals after his death. The school was founded in 1791 and converted to Williams College by action of the state legislature in 1793.

Ebenezer Fitch, the first president of Williams College, wrote a biographical sketch of Ephraim Jr. in 1802. He described the college's benefactor as follows: "In his person, he was large and fleshy...His address was easy, and his manners pleasing and conciliating. Affable and facetious, he could make himself agreeable in all companies; and was very generally esteemed, respected, and beloved."

There is some internet based commentary that suggests Ephraim Williams appears in an early version of "Yankee Doodle":

Brother Ephraim sold his Cow
And bought him a Commission;
And then he went to Canada
To fight for the Nation;

But when Ephraim he came home
He proved an arrant Coward,
He wouldn't fight the Frenchmen there
For fear of being devour'd.

However, this suggestion comes mostly from on-line commentators, who "just repeat earlier questionable, undocumented interpretations" without citation, and no reputable scholars "connect this 'arrant Coward' to the French and Indian War hero."

The song "Yankee Doodle" was re-appropriated by the British colonists from the derisive version of the Dutch settlers and turned into a rousing marching tune eventually making Yankee another name for American known world wide, with the first known version of the song apparently about Ephraim Williams, who fought the French at the battle of Fort Ticonderoga and the Battle of the Bloody Morning Scout.
