= Siege of Fort Massachusetts =

1746 siege

Coordinates: 42.7008°N 73.1092°W

- Part of King George's War
Date	19–20 August 1746
Location	North Adams, Massachusetts
Result	French-Indian victory

Belligerents
New France; Indian tribes	Massachusetts

Commanders and leaders
François-Pierre Rigaud de Vaudreuil	John Hawks

Strength
1,000	22 men, 3 women, 5 children

Casualties and losses
1 killed, 16 wounded	30 prisoners, 14 survived

The siege of Fort Massachusetts (19-20 August 1746) was a successful siege of Fort Massachusetts (in present-day North Adams, Massachusetts) by a mixed force of more than 1,000 French and Native Americans from New France. The fort, garrisoned by a disease-weakened militia force from the Province of Massachusetts Bay, surrendered after its supplies of ammunition and gunpowder were depleted. Thirty prisoners were taken and transported back to Quebec, where about half of them died in captivity.
