= Williamstown, Massachusetts =

- Town
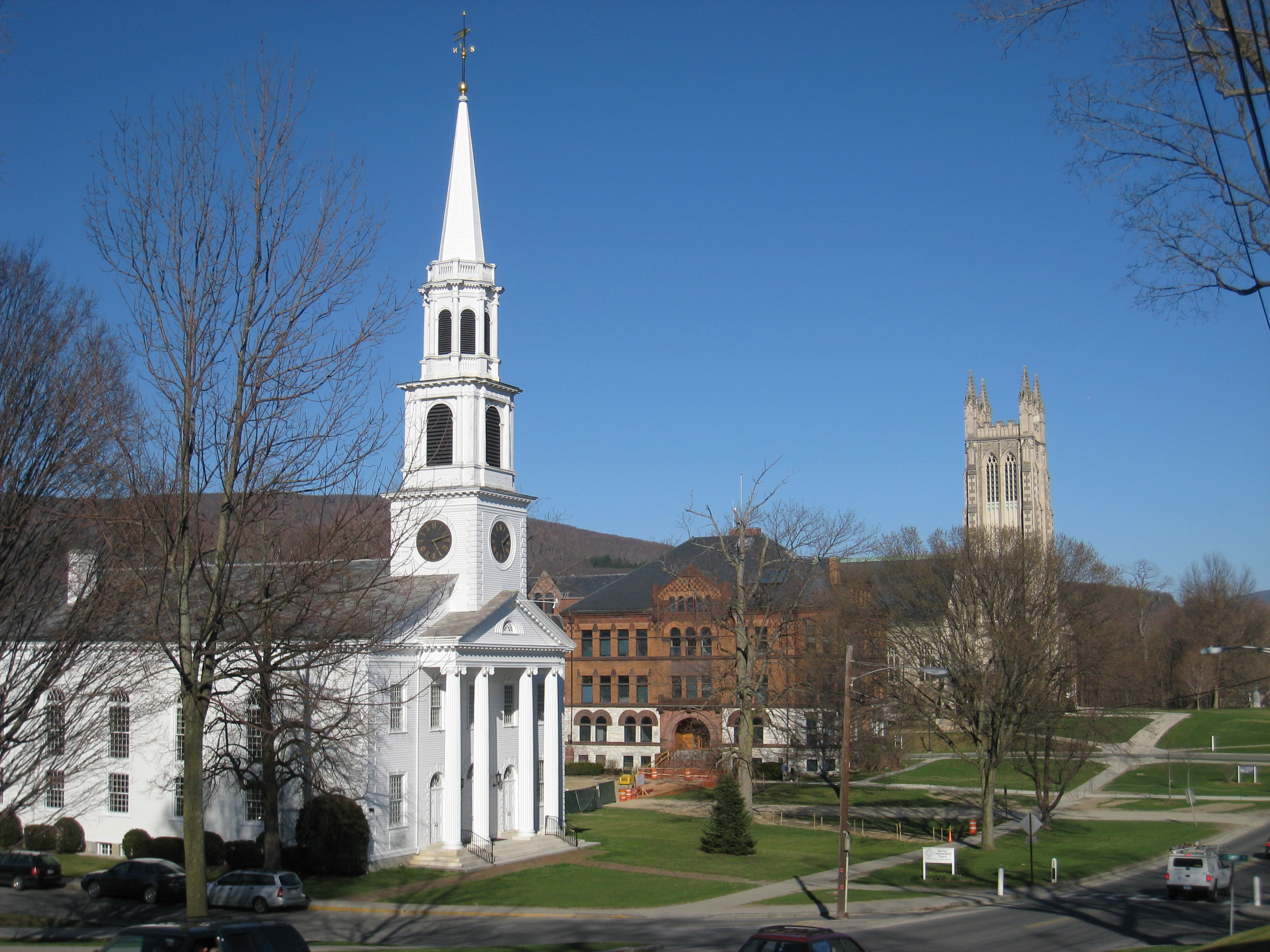
- Main Street, Williamstown, Massachusetts (April 2008)

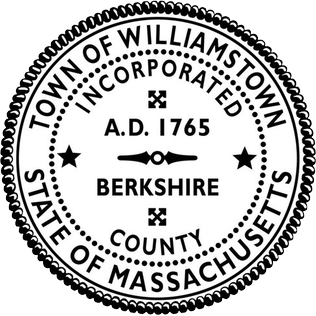
- Seal
- Motto: "The Village Beautiful"
- Location in Berkshire County and the state of Massachusetts
- Coordinates: 42°42′48″N 73°12′34″W
- Country: United States
- State: Massachusetts
- County: Berkshire
- Settled: 1749
- Incorporated: 1765
- Named for: Ephraim Williams

Government
  - Type: Open town meeting

Area
  - Total: 46.9 sq mi (121.4 km^{2})
  - Land: 46.8 sq mi (121.1 km^{2})
  - Water: 0.12 sq mi (0.3 km^{2})
- Elevation: 636 ft (194 m)

Population (2020)
  - Total: 7,513
  - Density: 160.7/sq mi (62.04/km^{2})
- Time zone: UTC−5 (Eastern)
  - Summer (DST): UTC−4 (Eastern)
- ZIP Code: 01267
- Area code: 413
- FIPS code: 25-79985
- GNIS feature ID: 0619430
- Website: williamstownma.gov

Williamstown is a town in Berkshire County, Massachusetts, United States. It shares a border with Vermont to the north and New York to the west. Located in Berkshire County, the town is part of the Pittsfield metropolitan statistical area. The population was 7,513 at the 2020 census. A college town, it is home to Williams College, the Clark Art Institute and the Tony-awarded Williamstown Theatre Festival.

== History ==
Originally called West Hoosac, the area was first settled in 1749. Prior to this time, its position along the Mohawk Trail made it ideal Mohican hunting grounds. Its strategic location bordering Dutch colonies in New York led to its settlement, because it was needed as a buffer to stop the Dutch from encroaching on Massachusetts. Fort West Hoosac, the westernmost blockhouse and stockade in Massachusetts, was built in 1756. The town was incorporated in 1765 as Williamstown according to the will of Col. Ephraim Williams, who was killed in the French and Indian War. He bequeathed a significant sum to the town on the condition that the town would be named after him and that a free school would be established. In 1791 the school opened but only lasted a short time as a free school. It became Williams College in 1793.

The primary industry was agriculture, particularly dairy farming, sheep herding and wool production. Sawmills and gristmills operated by water power at the streams. With the Industrial Revolution larger mills were added, including the Walley Mill and Williamstown Manufacturing Company (Station Mill), both of which produced textiles. The A. Loop & Company (Water Street Mill) produced twine. With the opening of the railroad, tourists arrived. Several inns and hotels were established, including the Idlewild Hotel and Greylock Hotel. In the late 1930s and 1940s, E. Parmelee Prentice and his wife Alta, the daughter of John D. Rockefeller, created Mount Hope Farm. With a mansion designed by James Gamble Rogers, it was one of the outstanding experimental farms in the country. Today, it belongs to Williams College, which remains the largest employer in town.

== Geography ==
According to the United States Census Bureau, the town has a total area of 46.9 square miles (121.4 km^{2}), of which 46.8 square miles (121.1 km^{2}) is land and 0.12 square miles (0.3 km^{2}), or 0.27%, is water. Located in the Berkshires, Williamstown is drained by the Hoosic River.

Williamstown is the northwesternmost town in Massachusetts. The town is bordered on the north by Pownal, Vermont, on the east by Clarksburg, North Adams and Adams, on the south by New Ashford and Hancock, and on the west by Berlin and Petersburgh, New York.

The town proper lies southwest of the confluence of the Green River and the Hoosic River. To the west, the Taconic Range lines the N.Y. state border and is where Taconic Trail State Park is located. Brodie Mountain rises to the south of town, and Mount Greylock State Reservation occupies the southwestern corner of town, with the peak of Mount Greylock and its subsidiary peak Mount Fitch just over the line in Adams. The highest point in town is at 3,320 feet (1,010 m) above sea level, just 0.2 miles (0.32 km) west of the summit of Greylock. The Appalachian Trail skirts the town twice, near the southeastern corner of town and again along the North Adams border. To the northeast, Pine Cobble lies along the Clarksburg town line, and to the north lies the Green Mountain National Forest in Vermont.

U.S. Route 7 passes from north to south through the town, crossing into Vermont to the north and New Ashford to the south. Massachusetts Route 2 begins in the town, starting from New York State Route 2 at the Petersburg Pass, then combining with Route 7 for a stretch before heading east into North Adams. From Route 7 westward, it is known as the Taconic Trail; the road does not become the Mohawk Trail in the east until passing through North Adams. Route 43 also begins at Route 2 and heads southward towards Hancock, crossing Route 7 near the fork of the east and west branches of the Green River.

== Demographics ==
Historical population
| Year | Pop. | ±% |
|---|---|---|
| 1790 | 1,769 | — |
| 1850 | 2,626 | +48.4% |
| 1860 | 2,611 | −0.6% |
| 1870 | 3,559 | +36.3% |
| 1880 | 3,394 | −4.6% |
| 1890 | 4,221 | +24.4% |
| 1900 | 5,013 | +18.8% |
| 1910 | 3,708 | −26.0% |
| 1920 | 3,707 | −0.0% |
| 1930 | 3,900 | +5.2% |
| 1940 | 4,294 | +10.1% |
| 1950 | 6,194 | +44.2% |
| 1960 | 7,322 | +18.2% |
| 1970 | 8,454 | +15.5% |
| 1980 | 8,741 | +3.4% |
| 1990 | 8,220 | −6.0% |
| 2000 | 8,424 | +2.5% |
| 2010 | 7,754 | −8.0% |
| 2020 | 7,513 | −3.1% |
| 2024 | 9,189 | +22.3% |
* = population estimate. Source: United States census records and Population Estimates Program data.

As of the 2000 census, there were 8,424 people, 2,753 households, and 1,693 families residing in the town. Williamstown is the fourth-largest town in Berkshire County, and ranks 189th out of the 351 cities and towns in Massachusetts by population. The population density was 179.7 inhabitants per square mile (69.4/km^{2}), ranking it 7th in the county and 264th in the Commonwealth. There were 3,053 housing units at an average density of 65.1 per square mile (25.1/km^{2}).

In 2017, the population of the town was estimated at 7,623. The racial makeup of the town in 2017 was 81.6% white (77.8% non-Hispanic white), 5.1% black, 0.9% Native American, 6.3% Asian (1.8% Chinese, 0.9% Korean, 0.9% Japanese, 0.5% Cambodian, 0.4% Nepalese, 0.3% Indonesian, 0.3% Indian, 0.3% Vietnamese, 0.2% Filipino, 0.2% Sri Lankan, 0.1% Thai), 0.00% Pacific Islander, 1.7% from other races, and 4.3% from two or more races. Hispanics and Latinos of any race were 7.5% of the population (3.1% Puerto Rican, 1.7% Mexican, 0.4% Dominican, 0.3% Cuban, 0.3% Ecuadorian, 0.3% Spanish, 0.2% Colombian, 0.2% Nicaraguan, 0.1% Costa Rican, 0.1% Guatemalan). The ten largest ancestry groups in the town were Irish (15.0%), English (12.5%), German (10.9%), Italian (9.7%), French (6.8%), Polish (6.7%), Scottish (3.9%), French-Canadian (3.1%), American (2.7%), and Russian (2.1%). Immigrants accounted for 11.6% of the population. The ten most common countries of origin for immigrants in the town were China, South Korea, Cambodia, Canada, Nepal, Ireland, Japan, Colombia, Indonesia, and Kenya.

In 2000 there were 2,753 households, out of which 24.7% had children under the age of 18 living with them, 51.3% were married couples living together, 7.9% had a female householder with no husband present, and 38.5% were non-families. Of all households, 32.7% were made up of individuals, and 15.7% had someone living alone who was 65 years of age or older. The average household size was 2.21 and the average family size was 2.80.

In the town, the population was spread out, with 15.3% under the age of 18, 27.5% from 18 to 24, 16.6% from 25 to 44, 21.0% from 45 to 64, and 19.6% who were 65 years of age or older. The median age was 36 years. For every 100 females, there were 87.8 males. For every 100 females age 18 and over, there were 85.8 males.

The median income for a household in the town was $51,875, and the median income for a family was $67,589. Males had a median income of $50,011 versus $32,845 for females. The per capita income for the town was $26,039. About 1.7% of families and 5.5% of the population were below the poverty line, including 1.3% of those under age 18 and 6.8% of those age 65 or over.

== Government ==
Williamstown is governed by the open town meeting form of government, and is governed by a board of selectmen and a town manager. The town has its own police department and a volunteer fire department. The town has its own library, Milne Public Library, and other public services. Ambulance services are covered by Northern Berkshire EMS. The nearest hospital, Southwestern Vermont Medical Center, is located in Bennington, to the north.

On the state level, Williamstown is represented in the Massachusetts House of Representatives by Representative John Barrett III of the First Berkshire district, which covers northern Berkshire County, as well as portions of Franklin County. In the Massachusetts Senate, the town is represented by Senator Paul W. Mark of the Berkshire, Hampden, Franklin, and Hampshire district. Williamstown is located in the Eighth Massachusetts Governor's Council district and is represented by Tara Jacobs.

== Education ==
The town has its own elementary school, Williamstown Elementary School, which serves students from pre-kindergarten through sixth grade. The town is home to Mount Greylock Regional School, which also serves the neighboring towns of New Ashford, Lanesborough and portions of Hancock. The school's colors are red and white, and the sports teams are nicknamed the Mounties. Williamstown is also home to Pine Cobble School, a private school serving students from pre-kindergarten through ninth grade, as well as Buxton School, a private co-educational boarding school serving high-school students.

Williamstown is home of Williams College, an elite, private liberal arts college. The nearest community college is Berkshire Community College, located in Pittsfield. The nearest public college is Massachusetts College of Liberal Arts in neighboring North Adams, and the nearest University of Massachusetts campus is the University of Massachusetts Amherst.

== Places of interest ==
- Williamstown Historical Museum, founded in 1941, is currently located in the historic South Center School building at 32 New Ashford Road. It catalogs the history of the area from when it was a stopping point along the Mohawk Trail to the present. In addition to permanent exhibits tracing the history of the town, there is a rotating exhibit which changes twice annually. Permanent exhibits include "From Wilderness to Williamstown", "The College: A Defining Presence", "Growth of a Summer Resort", and "The Twentieth Century: Continuity and Change", among others.
- The 1753 House was built in 1953 to help celebrate the 200th anniversary of the town's founding. Built by volunteers using 18th-century building materials and tools, the replica house is intended to recreate how a typical home is believed to have looked back in 1753.
- Clark Art Institute
- Williams College Museum of Art
- Field Farm
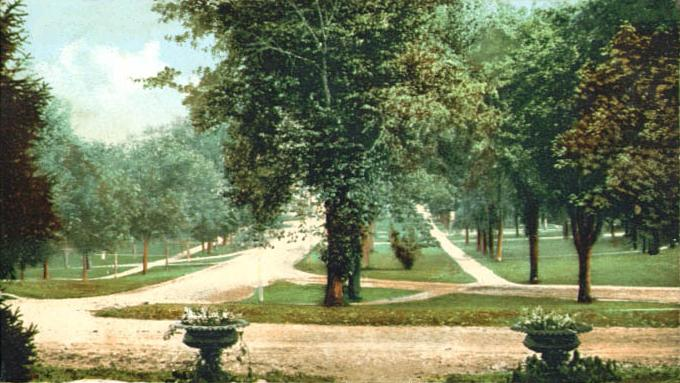
Main Street in 1907

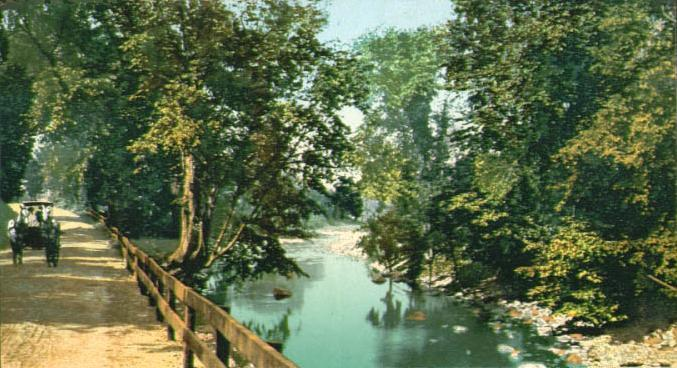
The road to South Williamstown in 1907

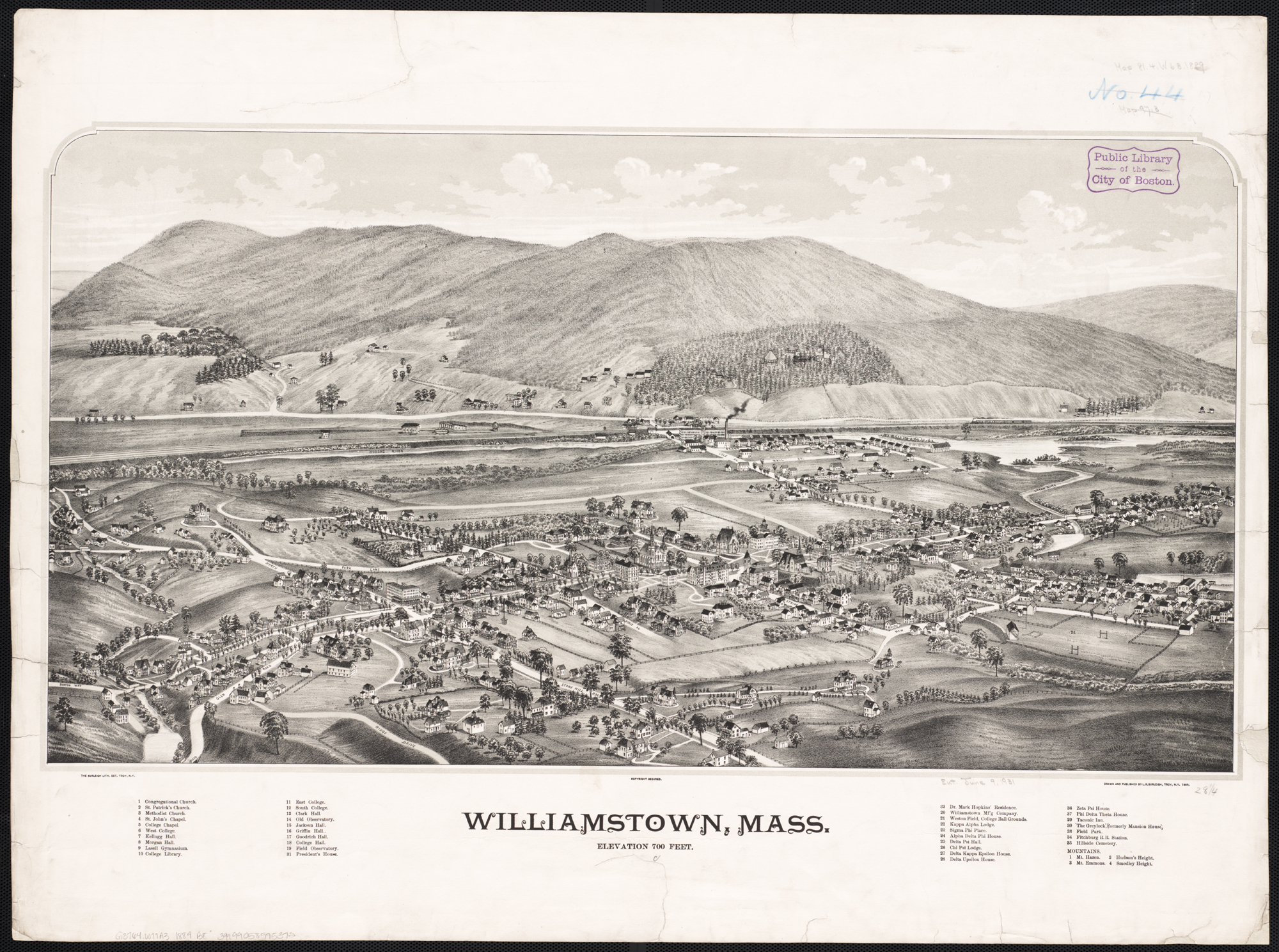
Print of Williamstown from the 1880s

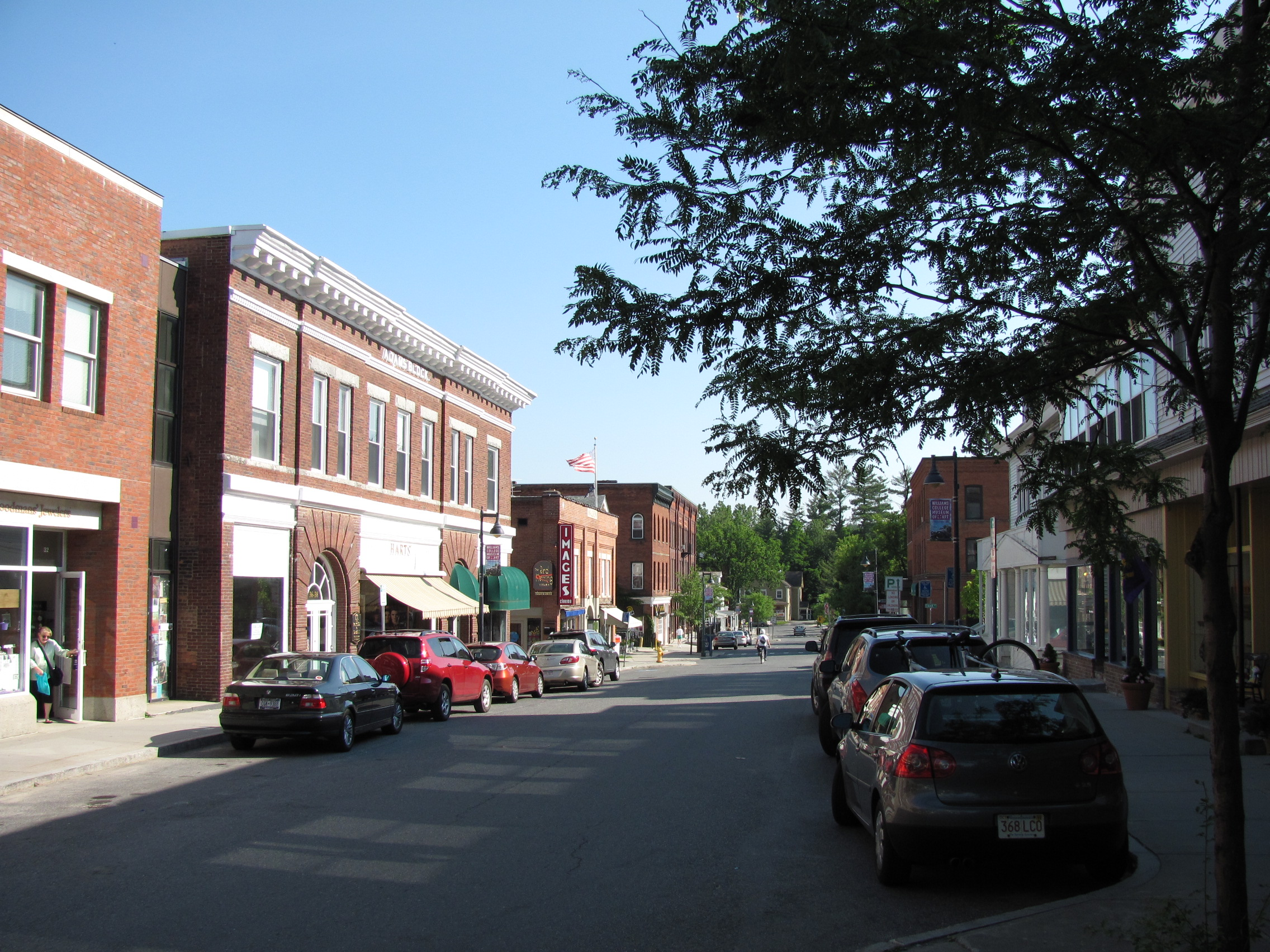
Spring Street in 2010

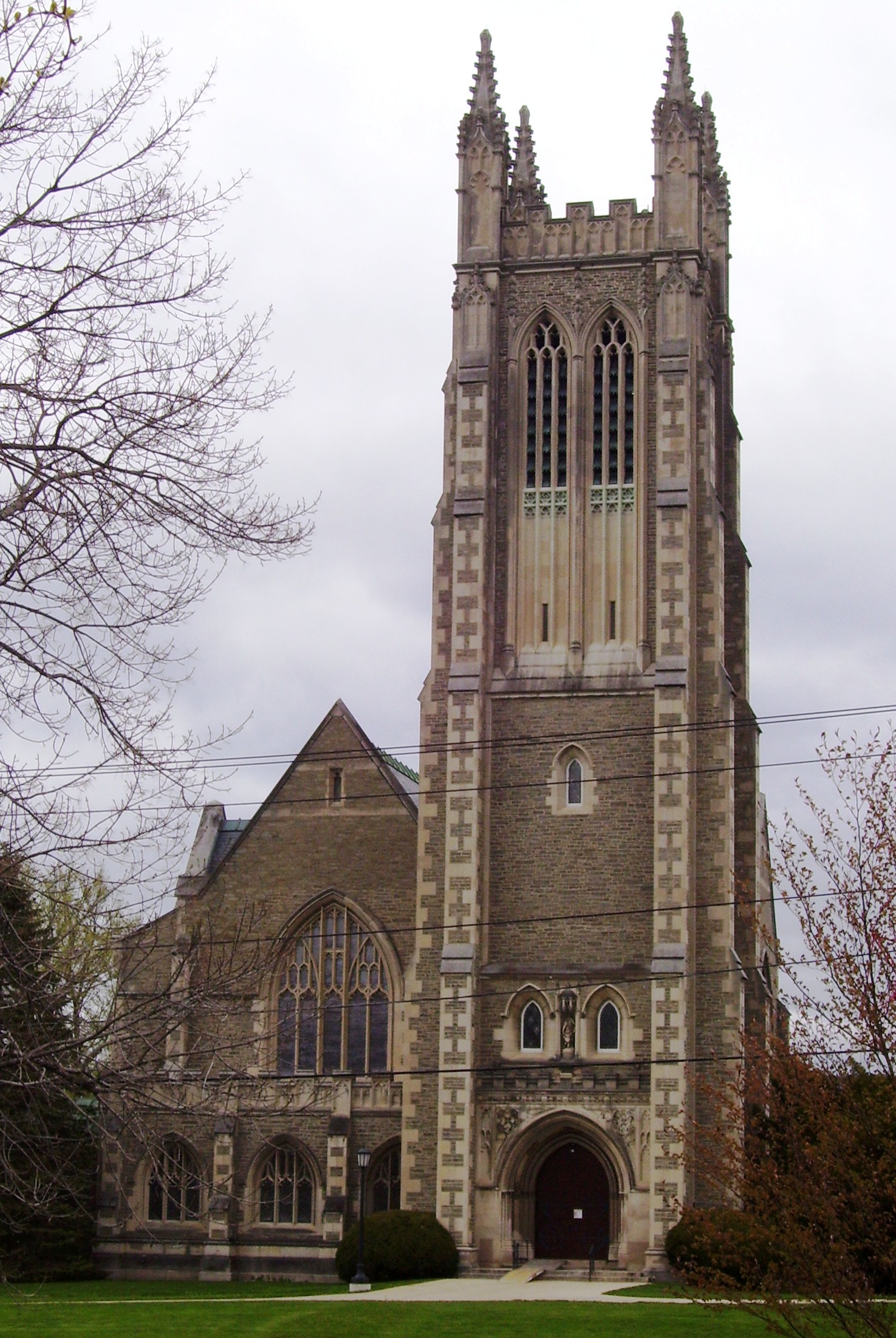
Thompson Memorial Chapel, part of Williams College, in 2012

== Notable people ==
- W. J. Abrams, Wisconsin state senator
- Herbert Allen Jr., businessman
- Albert LeRoy Andrews, professor of Germanic philology and avocational bryologist
- Jean Ankeney, Vermont state senator
- Florence Bascom, geologist
- John Bascom, educator, author and President of University of Wisconsin
- Ali Benjamin, author
- Bernard Blair, congressman
- Gerald Warner Brace, author and educator
- James MacGregor Burns, historian and biographer
- Albert Cummings, blues guitarist
- Daniel Dewey, congressman
- Dick Farley, football player and coach
- Ali Fedotowsky, reality-TV contestant (2001–2007)
- Darra Goldstein, cookbook author and food scholar
- Stephen Hannock, painter
- Carol Holloway, actress
- Mark Hopkins, educator, President of Williams College
- Peter H. Hunt, producer and director
- Alex Kershaw, author
- Elizabeth Kolbert, journalist and author
- Margaret Krieger, underwent Vermont's only recorded witch trial
- Joe McGinniss, author
- Francis Christopher Oakley, historian, President of Williams College
- Farah Pahlavi (born 1938), former empress of Iran
- John Bennett Perry, actor
- Matthew Perry (1969–2023), actor
- Cole Porter, songwriter
- Roger Rees, actor
- Christopher Reeve, actor
- Dick Sabot, economist
- John Edward Sawyer, historian, soldier, Wiliams pres., Mellon Foundation pres.
- Michael Scanlan, friar
- Morton O. Schapiro, professor, Williams College president
- Benjamin Simonds, Revolutionary War commander
- Jane Swift, former Lieutenant governor and acting Governor
- Charles Stebbins, member of the New York State Senate and acting lieutenant governor
- George Steinbrenner, New York Yankees owner
- William Henry Vanderbilt III, statesman
- Fay Vincent, baseball commissioner
- Bill Wootters, physicist

== Transportation ==
Williamstown is crossed by U.S. Route 7, MA Route 2—also known as the Mohawk Trail—and MA Route 43. Town bus service is provided by Berkshire Regional Transit Authority (BRTA) to and from North Adams and Pittsfield. The Green Mountain Express' Purple Line provides a weekday commuter bus route northward to Bennington. Daily intercity bus service to Williamstown is operated by Peter Pan Lines to and from New York City, and intermediate towns and cities along the way.

There is a freight rail line that passes from the north to the east into North Adams and the Hoosac Tunnel. The nearest Amtrak train station, on the Boston-Chicago Lake Shore Limited line is in Pittsfield. Until 1958 there had been passenger Boston & Maine service from nearby North Adams to Troy, New York. Previously, that service continued to Chicago. Until 1960 there had been service from North Adams to Boston's North Station on the Fitchburg Line which has been truncated to Fitchburg. The nearest small-craft airport is Harriman-and-West Airport in North Adams, and the nearest airport with commercial jet service is Albany International Airport.
