= Lak Ha =

Neighbourhood in Thailand

Coordinates: 13.555912°N 100.039081°E

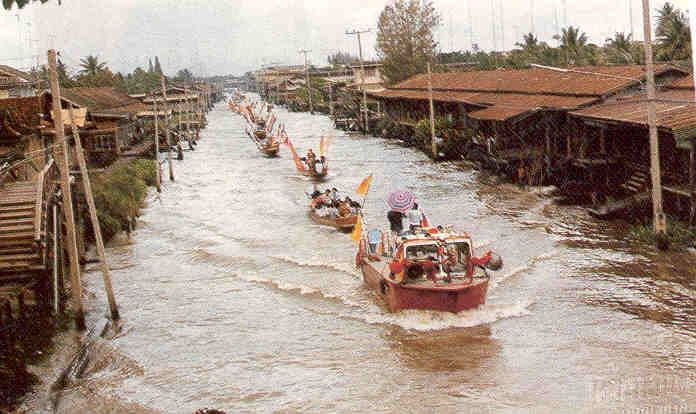
Procession of Buddha by boat along Khlong Damnoen Saduak in Lak Ha area

Lak Ha (Thai: หลักห้า, pronounced [làk hâː]) is a subdistrict municipality in the western part of Ban Phaeo district of Samut Sakhon province, western Thailand.

== History ==
Its name Lak Ha means "fifth milestone", referring to the fifth milestone of Khlong Damnoen Saduak, a khlong (canal) dug in king Mongkut's reign (Rama IV) bridging rivers of Tha Chin to Mae Klong. The man-made straight line canal, approximately 35 km (21.7 mi) long, divided into eight milestones from the beginning to the destination at Bang Nok Khwaek Watergate, Samut Songkhram province. It took two years, between 1866 and 1868, to complete.

Lak Ha is a Khlong Damnoen Saduak waterfront community.

== Geography ==
The terrain is a drainage basin, about 1 m (3.3 ft) to 2 m (6.6 ft) above sea level.

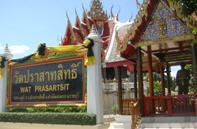
Wat Prasat Sith

Khlong Damnoen Saduak that flows through the area considered as the local main watercourse. It also branched into many different tributaries, both natural and man-made waterways.

== Administration ==
Lak Ha was established as sukhaphiban (sanitation district) in 1956. It was upgraded to a thesaban tambon (subdistrict municipality) in 1999. It has an administrative area comprising four subdistricts, namely Yokkrabat, Nong Bua, Nong Song Hong, and Rong Khe, 41 mubans (villages), with a total area of 125.57 km^{2}.

Lak Ha subdistrict municipality	Pop.	Households	villages	ISO-code
Subdistrict Yokkrabat	15,167	4,417	12	TH-740303
Subdistrict Rong Khe	12,147	3,324	10	TH-740304
Subdistrict Nong Song Hong	8,326	2,064	10	TH-740305
Subdistrict Nong Bua	6,656	1,636	9	TH-740306
Total	42,296	11,441	41	

Lak Ha subdistrict municipality hemmed by other areas (from the north clockwise): Bang Phae in Ratchaburi province, and Sam Phran in Nakhon Pathom province, Ban Phaeo and Mueang Samut Sakhon in Samut Sakhon province, with Damnoen Saduak in Ratchaburi province and Mueang Samut Songkhram in Samut Songkhram province, respectively.

The subdistrict municipality slogan is "The prosperous agricultural town, the territory of four subdistricts, strong communities join forces to develop".
