= Pho Hak =

Subdistrict of Ratchaburi province, Thailand

Coordinates: 13.648539°N 100.006321°E

Pho Hak (Thai: โพหัก, pronounced [pʰōːhàk]) is a tambon (subdistrict) of Bang Phae district, Ratchaburi province, western Thailand.

== History ==
Pho Hak (literally "broken bodhi tree") has a lot of land still retains its past and rural character. It was used as a filming location for Plae Kao, a 1977 rural love tragedy film.

== Geography ==
Pho Hak is a plain that is flooded all year round because of the influence of sea water pushing into the Mae Klong mouth and Khlong Damnoen Saduak canal. Therefore, it is suitable for farming and agriculture. There are no mountains and forests, with a total area of approximately 22,484 rais (33.155 km^{2}).

The condition of the soil is clay and sandy soil.

It is approximately 46 km (28.6 mi) from Bangkok by car, 38 km (23.6 mi) from Ratchaburi town and 14 km (8.7 mi) from Bang Phae District Office.

The main water resource is Khlong Pho Hak canal that flows through the area.

Neighbouring subdistricts are (from the north clockwise), Don Kha and Don Yai in its district, Nong Song Hong in Ban Phaeo district, Samut Sakhon province and Talat Chinda in Sam Phran district, Nakhon Pathom province, Bua Ngam and Don Khlang in Damnoen Saduak district, Hua Pho in its district and Don Khlang in Damnoen Saduak district, respectively.

== Administration ==
All areas are administered by Pho Hak Subdistrict Municipality.

It can also be divided into 11 mubans (village).

== Economy ==
At present, Pho Hak is the place with the most giant river prawn farms in Thailand.
