= Nicholas Bunkerd Kitbamrung =

Beatified Thai Catholic priest

Blessed Nicholas Bunkerd Kitbamrung
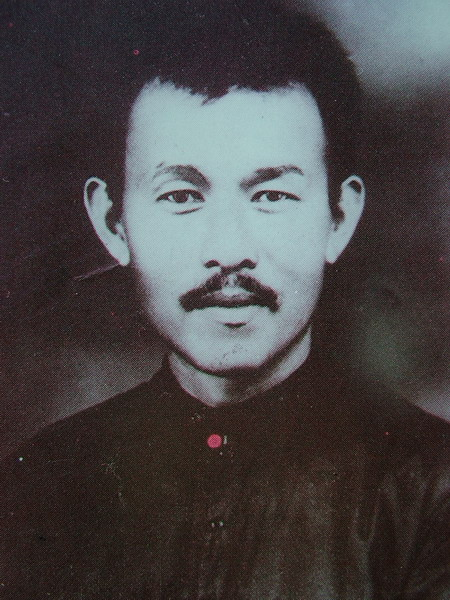

Martyr
- Born: 31 January 1895; Nakhon Pathom, Thailand
- Died: 12 January 1944 (aged 48); Bang Kwang Central Prison, Bangkok, Thailand
- Venerated in: Catholic Church
- Beatified: 5 March 2000, Saint Peter's Square by Pope John Paul II
- Major shrine: Assumption Cathedral, Bangkok
- Feast: 12 January

Nicholas Bunkerd Kitbamrung (Thai: นิโคลาส บุญเกิด กฤษบำรุง; RTGS: Bunkoet Kritbamrung; 31 January 1895 – 12 January 1944) was a Thai Catholic priest. Kitbamrung studied for almost two decades prior to his ordination at which stage he began pastoral work as an assistant to two pastors across Thai provinces. He soon became a noted catechist who instructed Salesian seminarians in such while teaching Salesian priests the Thai language. He was thrown into prison in 1941 when the Thai authorities accused him of espionage and collaboration with the French (whom the Thai were hostile towards) and he died in 1944 from tuberculosis after prolonged periods of mistreatment.

He is the first Thai from the faith recognized for being killed "ex aerumnis carceris" ("from the hardships of incarceration") following his beatification. The beatification was celebrated on 5 March 2000 in Saint Peter's Square.

== Early life ==
Nicholas Bunkerd Kitbamrung was born on 31 January 1895 in Nakhon Pathom as one of six children to Joseph Poxang and Agnes Thiang Kitbamrung; some sources suggest that he was born on 28 February though his parish's baptismal register disputes this. Both parents were converts to the faith. Kitbamrung received baptism on 5 February in the parish of Saint Peter's from Father (and future bishop) René-Marie-Joseph Perros with the name "Benedict".

He commenced his ecclesial studies in Hang Xan at the Sacred Heart ecclesial institute in 1908 (1908–16) and completed a period in which he worked as a catechist in 1920. He continued studies abroad in 1920 at the Penang ecclesial institute and concluded in 1925 all the while having received the minor orders (August 1924) as well as both the subdiaconate (August 1925) and the diaconate (September 1925).

== Missionary works ==
He received his ordination to the priesthood on 24 January 1926 in the Cathedral of the Assumption in Bangkok from Bishop René-Marie-Joseph Perros. His first assignment following his ordination was to work as an assistant pastor at Bang Nok Kheuk (Bang Nok Khwaek) parish in the Samut Songkhram province alongside Father Durand (parish priest of the Bang Nokkhuek church (now the Nativity of Our Lady Cathedral)). In 1928 he was transferred to Phitsanulok where he taught the Thai language to Salesian priests while teaching catechesis to their sixteen seminarians. It was at this time that he learnt the Chinese dialect Hakka himself.

Kitbamarung assisted the Salesians after their arrival on 26 October 1927 in Thailand in Siam. On 1 January 1928 the mission that Durand and Kitbamrung led had ended after the parish and its work was entrusted to the now-trained Salesians. In light of this he was appointed as the associate pastor to the French priest Mirabel in 1929 who had just arrived in Thailand himself. In 1930 Mirabel expanded his work to northern Siam and asked Bishop Perros to send a priest as his replacement since he wanted Kitbamrung to work with him up north. The two began in Lampang but Mirabel had a change of heart and wanted Kitbamrung to work there while Mirabel travelled further north. It was there he continued to evangelize and he even helped out his fellow priests with their financial debts.

In 1930 he was sent to northern Vietnam to work in the missions there and then did the same thing later in Chiang Mai in northern Thailand where he was to help lapsed Catholics and to re-evangelize the region. He was then sent to the Khorat district to engage further in catechesis and evangelization while he himself evangelized almost unexplored lands along the Laos border in 1937.

== Persecution ==
Kitbamrung fought for the freedom of worship and the right to profess faith in a culture that was Buddhist with the Thai government being Buddhist (and preferring Buddhism) itself. The authorities regarded Kitbamrung with suspicion and came to accuse him of collaborating with the French (whom the Thai were hostile towards). The Thai authorities regarded him as a dangerous individual who wanted to incite Thais to rebel against the government of Field Marshal Plaek Phibunsongkhram.

In the French Indochina war he was accused of acting as an informant for France (espionage) and was arrested for this on 12 January 1941 while at the Santa Teresa parish. But before his arrest he went to Saint Joseph's church at Ban Han on 11 January to join Father Ambrosio Kin Minlukum (its pastor) but found he was not there. He instead gathered the parishioners to remind them to attend the next Mass which he would preside over himself. He rang the bell the following morning at 8:30am which proved the trigger for the authorities to arrest him. Kitbamrung was prosecuted for "rebellion against the kingdom" and imprisoned in Bang Khwang prison. He was sentenced to over a decade of imprisonment (he would have been in prison until 1956 had he survived) where he baptized 68 prison companions and preached the Gospel to them.

== Death ==
He died due to tuberculosis – which he contracted in prison – in 1944 in Bangkok. He was refused treatment because he was a Catholic. Kitbamrung recited rosaries on a frequent basis since he found consolation in doing so. His remains are now buried under the main altar at the Assumption Cathedral in Bangkok.

== Beatification ==
From 1992 the faithful in Bangkok started to press the archdiocese to initiate the cause for the late priest's beatification. The formal application was sent to the Congregation for the Causes of Saints in Rome who accepted the request. The cause started on 7 March 1995 after the C.C.S. declared "nihil obstat" (no objections) to the cause and titled Kitbamrung as a Servant of God. The diocesan process lasted little more than a week in a short diocesan process that the Cardinal Archbishop of Bangkok Michael Michai Kitbunchu oversaw from 13 to 23 January 1998; the C.C.S. validated this process some months later on 29 May prior to receiving the Positio for evaluation in 1999.

Theologians confirmed the cause on 29 October 1999 as did the cardinal and bishop members of the C.C.S. three months later on 11 January 2000. The confirmation of his beatification arrived a week later on 27 January after Pope John Paul II confirmed that Kitbamrung died "ex aerumnis carceris" (from the hardships of incarceration) bought on due to intense hatred for Kitbamrung's faith. John Paul II beatified Kitbamrung in Saint Peter's Square on 5 March 2000.
