= Nam Chiao =

Sub-district in Trat, Thailand

Coordinates: 12°11′23″N 102°27′47″E

Nam Chiao (Thai: น้ำเชี่ยว, pronounced [náːm t͡ɕʰîa̯w]) is a tambon (sub-district) of Laem Ngop District, Trat Province, eastern Thailand.

== Geography ==
The area features foothills, plains and mangrove forests.

Neighboring tambons are (from the north clockwise): Khlong Yai, Nong Sano, Laem Ngop, Khlong Yai.

It is about 9 km (5.5 mi) from Mueang Trat District.

== History ==
Nam Chiao consists of four mubans (villages).The main village is Ban Nam Chiao, a more than 200-year-old community.

Originally, Nam Chiao people were Thai Buddhists. Later, Chinese came to trade by junk and settled there. In the reign of King Rama III, Cham Muslims fled the French suppression from Cambodia to settle there. Nam Chiao then comprised three races and three religions.

== Culture ==
The three houses of worship are Wat (Thai temple), Church, and Masjid are evidence of the district.

== Economy ==
Nam Chiao developed an ecotourism site. The highlight is Saphan Wat Chai (สะพานวัดใจ), an arched bridge over the khlong that is the same height as the three-story building or the spar of a fishing boat. Locals call this bridge the Daredevil Bridge.

== Etymology ==
Its name Nam Chiao means "torrent", referring to a large khlong (canal) that runs through the district. During flooding season the water will flow rapidly that it cannot be sailed.

== Administration ==
=== Central administration ===
Nam Chiao is subdivided into four administrative villages

No.	Name	Thai
1.	Ban Tai Khao	บ้านท้ายเขา
2.	Ban Nong Yai	บ้านหนองใหญ่
3.	Ban Nam Chiao	บ้านน้ำเชี่ยว
4.	Ban Tha Pradu	บ้านท่าประดู่

=== Local administration ===
The area of the tambon is shared by local governments.

- the thesaban tambon (subdistrict municipality) Nam Chiao (เทศบาลตำบลน้ำเชี่ยว)

== Local products ==
- Ngob (wide-brimmed straw hat)
- Distilled liquor
