= John Bosco Manat Chuabsamai =

Catholic bishop

- Bishop of Ratchaburi
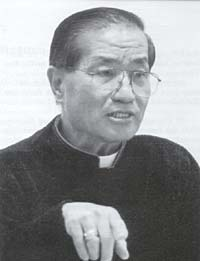
- Native name: ยอห์น บอสโก มนัส จวบสมัย
- Church: Catholic Church
- Diocese: Diocese of Ratchaburi
- In office: 25 November 1985 – 24 July 2003
- Predecessor: Joseph Ek Thabping
- Successor: Panya Kritcharoen

Orders
- Ordination: 10 May 1961
- Consecration: 6 January 1986 by Pope John Paul II

Personal details
- Born: 31 October 1935 Bang Nok Khwaek, Samut Songkhram, Thailand
- Died: 20 October 2011 (aged 75)

John Bosco Manat Chuabsamai (Thai: มนัส จวบสมัย; RTGS: Manat Chuapsamai; 31 October 1935 – 20 October 2011) was a Thai Roman Catholic prelate, who served as the bishop of Ratchaburi from 1986 to 2003.

Manat was born on 31 October 1935 in Bang Nok Khwaek. He was of Min Chinese descent, as the surname "Chua" (蔡) is commonly associated with the Teochew and Hokkien communities originating from Fujian and Guangdong, China. He was sent to study philosophy and theology in Madras, India, and was then ordained a priest on 10 May 1961. After ordination, he worked in parish, school, and seminary posts in the Diocese of Ratchaburi. In 1976/77, he studied at The Catholic University of America in Washington, D.C., from which he obtained a master's degree in philosophy. He then taught philosophy at the Lux Mundi seminary, the only major seminary in Thailand. In 1984, he became rector of the seminary.

On 25 November 1985, Manat was appointed bishop of Ratchaburi in succession to the late Joseph Ek Thabping. On 6 January 1986, he was consecrated bishop by Pope John Paul II in Rome.

In May 1993, during a visit to Manila in the Philippines, Manat came into contact with the Society of Saint Pius X. In April 2000, he met with the Superior General of the Society, Bishop Bernard Fellay. In 2001, he visited many of the Society's chapels in the United States. He resigned as bishop of Ratchaburi on 24 July 2003.
