= Tong Jee Teung =

Coordinates: 13.5241°N 99.9628°E

Tong Jee Teung (Thai: โรงเจ ท่งจี๊ตึ๊ง; Chinese:統濟堂) is a wooden Chinese style Taoist temple built in 1878. Located in Ratchaburi Province in central Thailand, it is situated beside the military canal Khlong Damnoen Saduak. The canal was built by King Chulalongkorn in 1868 attracting a large number of Chinese immigrants to the

== Architecture ==
All structures are single storey wooden buildings beside the Khlong Damnoen Saduak canal. Its main gate is adorned with a pair of couplets, using a red background and golden characters: “統統萬象迎吉X; 濟濟一堂納禎祥.” Its main hall gate has a pair of couplets, using a black background and golden characters: “統守王章佈德恩廬光聖道; 濟持佛法施仁救世顯神通.” The main enshrined Taoist statue is of Xi Wangmu (เอี่ยวตี๊กิมบ้อ (瑤池金母)). A large religious celebration is held on July 18 (lunar calendar), employing Teochew opera troupes. It includes the distribution of rice and food to the poor. Thai people believe Xi Wangmu can bring them a long and easy life, riches, and health. Other enshrined Taoist statues at this site include the Nine Emperors (เทศกาลกินเจ (九皇大帝)), Avalokiteśvara (กวนอิม (觀音)), Gautama Buddha (พระโคตมพุทธเจ้า (釋迦牟尼)), and Xuan Wu (a.k.a.: Chao Poh Suea; เจ้าพ่อเสือ (玄天上帝)).
