= Ngop =

Ngop may refer to:

- Ngop, South Sudan, a village in Unity State of South Sudan
- Thai farmer's hat, known in Thai as ngop
