= Damnoen Saduak Floating Market =

Market in Ratchaburi province, Thailand

Coordinates: 13.5193°N 99.9592°E

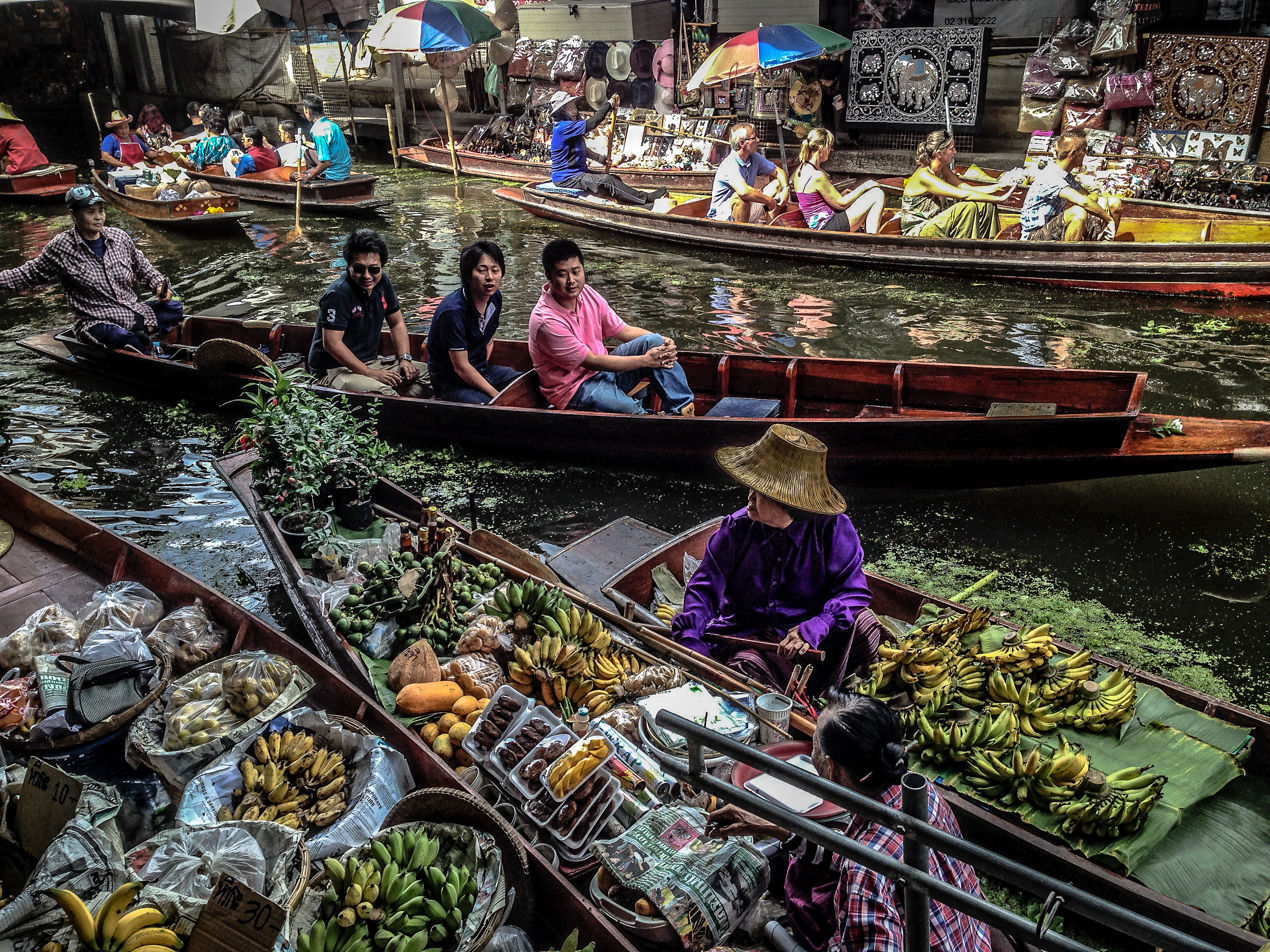
Damnoen Saduak Floating Market

Damnoen Saduak Floating Market (Thai: ตลาดน้ำดำเนินสะดวก, RTGS: Talat Nam Damnoen Saduak, pronounced [tā.làːt náːm dām.nɤ̄ːn sā.dùak]) is a floating market in Damnoen Saduak district, Ratchaburi province, about 100 kilometres (62 mi) southwest of Bangkok, Thailand. It has become primarily a tourist attraction, attracting domestic and foreign tourists. It is often considered the most famous floating market.

== History ==
From 1866 to 1868, by order of King Rama IV, the 32-kilometre (20 mi)-long Damnoen Saduak Canal was constructed to connect the Mae Klong and Tha Chin Rivers. Many floating markets arose from the canal, and about 200 ancillary canals were dug by villagers. The main floating market was called Lad Plee market (ลัดพลี, RTGS: Lat Phli) which adjoined a Buddhist temple and remained active until 1967 when the development of roads replaced the need for water transportation. This pattern was seen with other old floating markets which disappeared by the mid-20th century due to the development of modern land infrastructure.

In 1971, the Tourism Authority of Thailand (TAT) made the Lad Plee market a tourist attraction for foreigners. The market had boat vendors and shops on the canal banks. In 1981, a new road was built to Ton Canal, and private entrepreneurs established the modern Damnoen Saduak Floating Market along this canal.

== Description ==
Damnoen Saduak Floating Market consists of a maze of narrow khlongs (canals). Female traders, often wearing traditional mo hom apparel (blue farmers' shirts) with wide-brimmed straw hats (ngob) use sampans (small wooden boats) to sell their wares, often produce. These boats are often full of vegetables and colorful fruits that are photogenic, and these images are used for tourism promotion. The market is often the busiest in the morning from 07:00 to 09:00 and is active until noon. A roof was built for the market so that it could be operated every day and all day

The floating market includes three smaller markets: Ton Khem, Hia Kui, and Khun Phitak. Ton Khem is the largest market and is on Khlong Damnoen Saduak. Hia Kui is parallel to Khlong Damnoen Saduak and has souvenir shops on the canal banks to sell goods to larger tour groups. Khun Phitak is about 2 kilometres (1.2 mi) south of Hia Kui and is the smallest and least crowded market.

The floating market is crowded with tourists and is considered a tourist trap. As such, the wares tend to be overpriced. Bargaining is a common practice, although the prices of souvenirs and food are generally fixed within a few baht. Canoe cooks can be found preparing and selling boat noodles. The floating market also has been noted to lack cultural authenticity, although it remains a popular destination for both foreign and domestic tourists.

The market has been featured in several films. A canal chase scene in The Man with the Golden Gun with Roger Moore as James Bond was filmed at the market, and the 2008 film Bangkok Dangerous starring Nicolas Cage includes a scene that takes place at the market.
