= Beata Mundi Regina =

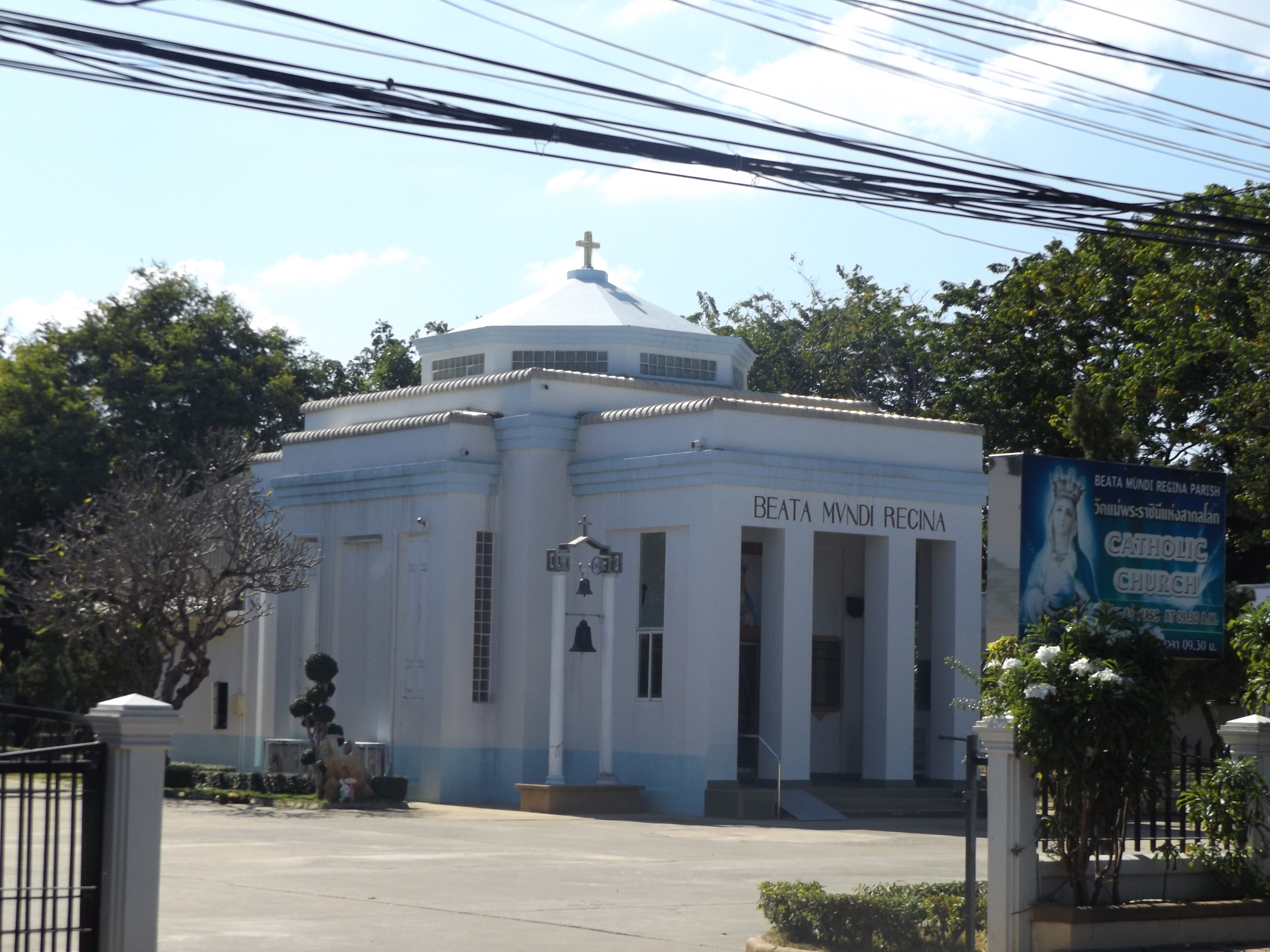
- Beata Mundi Regina
- 14.03107°N 99.52392°E
- Location: Kanchanaburi
- Country: Thailand
- Denomination: Roman Catholic Church

History
- Consecrated: 7 August 1955

Architecture
- Years built: 1955

Beata Mundi Regina (Thai: วัดแม่พระราชินีแห่งสากลโลก) is a Roman Catholic church in Kanchanaburi, Thailand located within the Diocese of Ratchaburi. It is situated in the vicinity of Kanchanaburi War Cemetery and was built in 1955 to honor Dutch soldiers who died during Death Railway construction. The church was consecrated on 7 August 1955, and built with money provided by the then Dutch ambassador to Thailand—self-appointed carrier of memory. It was renovated in 2006.

The church is a home to Carmelite Capuchin Convent order. Its name, Beata Mundi, is intended to honor Our Lady Mary, Queen of the World.

== See also ==
- Roman Catholicism in Thailand
