= Bang Khonthi district =

Bang Khonthi บางคนที
- District
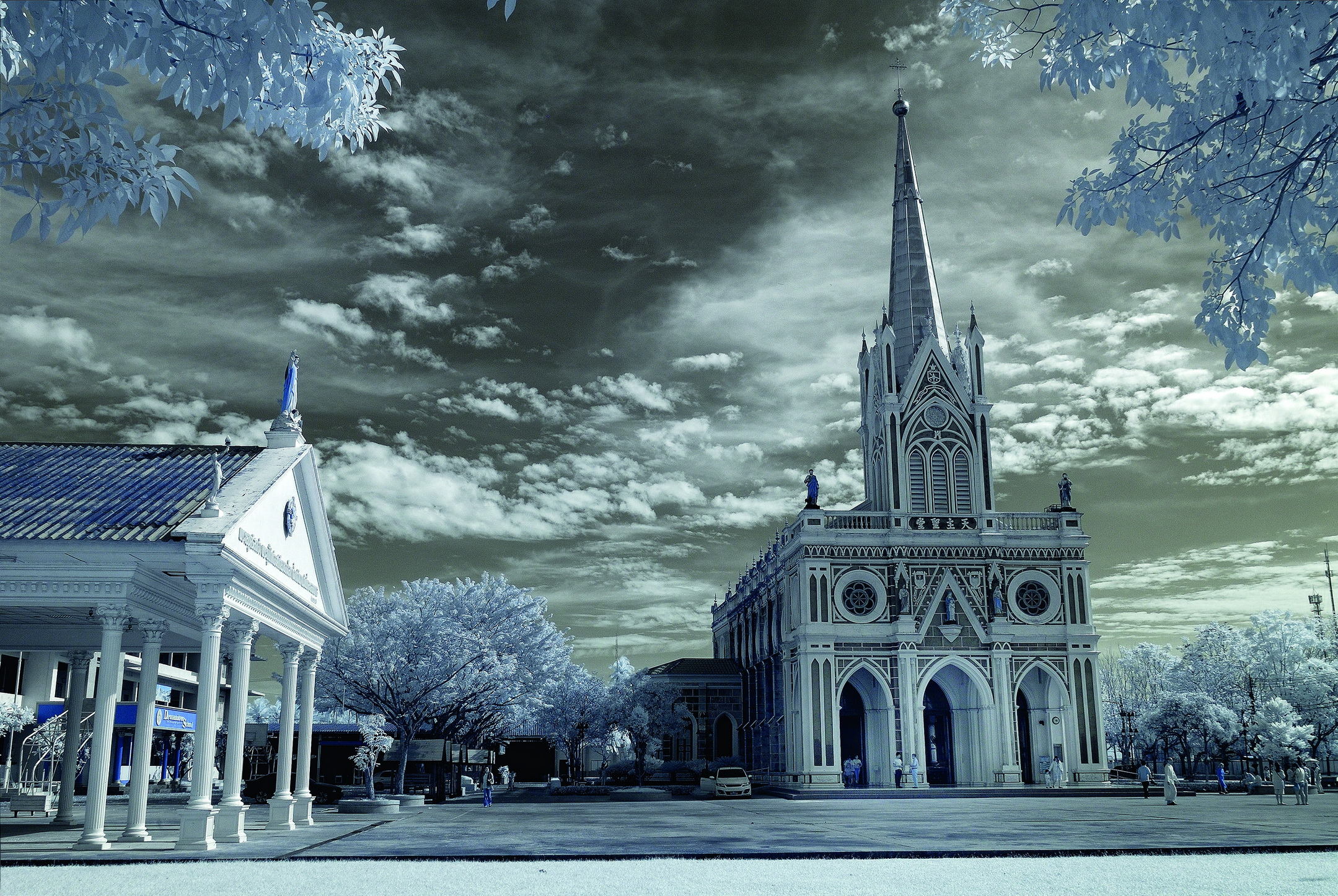
- The Nativity of Our Lady Cathedral, Bang Nok Kwaek, Bang Khonthi District

- District location in Samut Songkhram province
- Coordinates: 13°28′8″N 99°56′26″E
- Country: Thailand
- Province: Samut Songkhram
- Seat: Kradangnga

Area
  - Total: 77.5 km^{2} (29.9 sq mi)

Population (2023)
  - Total: 30,389
  - Density: 392/km^{2} (1,020/sq mi)
- Time zone: UTC+7 (ICT)
- Postal code: 75120
- Calling code: 034
- ISO 3166 code: TH-7502

Bang Konthi (Thai: บางคนที, pronounced [bāːŋ kʰōn.tʰīː]) is a district (amphoe) of Samut Songkhram province.

== Geography ==
The district is slightly inland at the northwestern tip of the Bay of Bangkok. Neighboring districts are (from the east clockwise) Mueang Samut Songkhram, Amphawa, Wat Phleng, Mueang Ratchaburi and Damnoen Saduak, the latter three in Ratchaburi province. The Mae Klong river flows through the district.

== History ==
In 1913, the district was enlarged by incorporating the district Mae Nam Om. Additionally, it was reassigned from Ratchaburi to Samut Songkhram. In 1914 the name was changed from Si Muen (สี่หมื่น) to Bang Konthi.

== Administration ==
=== Central government ===
The district is divided into thirteen subdistricts (tambons), which are further subdivided into 101 villages (mubans).

No.	Subdistrict	Thai	Villages	Pop.
1.	Kradangnga	กระดังงา	13	5,084
2.	Bang Sakae	บางสะแก	7	1,912
3.	Bang Yi Rong	บางยี่รงค์	10	1,663
4.	Rong Hip	โรงหีบ	9	2,013
5.	Bang Khonthi	บางคนที	9	2,208
6.	Don Manora	ดอนมะโนรา	8	3,942
7.	Bang Phrom	บางพรม	8	2,626
8.	Bang Kung	บางกุ้ง	7	1,530
9.	Chom Pluak	จอมปลวก	7	3,059
10.	Bang Nok Khwaek	บางนกแขวก	7	1,280
11.	Yai Phaeng	ยายแพง	5	1,427
12.	Bang Krabue	บางกระบือ	5	1,960
13.	Ban Pramote	บ้านปราโมทย์	6	1,685
		Total	101	30,389

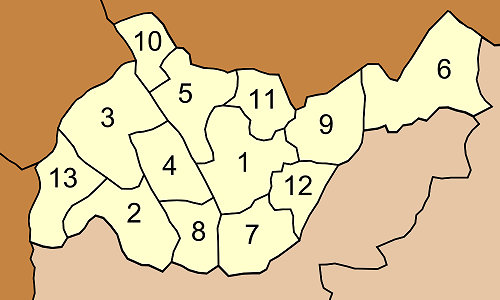
Map of subdistricts

=== Local government ===
As of December 2023 there are four subdistrict municipalities (thesaban tambon), Bang Krabue, Bang Yi Rong cover the whole subdistrict and Kradangnga covers a part of the subdistrict and Bang Nok Khwaek covers also a part of Bang Khonthi subdistrict. There are also seven subdistrict administrative organizations - SAO (ongkan borihan suan tambon - o bo to). Don Manora, Chom Pluak and Bang Phrom cover the whole subdistrict, while Kradangnga covers a part of the subdistrict. Six former SAO's were combined into three SAO's: Bang Sakae with Ban Promote, Rong Hip with Bang Kung and Bang Khonthi with Yai Phaeng.

Subdistrict municipality	Pop.	website
Kradangnga	2,103	kdg.go.th
Bang Krabue	1,960	bangkrabuecity.go.th
Bang Yi Rong	1,663	bangyirong.go.th

Bang Nok Kwaek subd. mun.	Pop.	bnk.go.th
Bang Nok Kwaek	1,280	
Bang Khonthi	426	
Total	1,706	

Subdistrict adm.org-SAO	Pop.	website
Don Manora	3,942	donmanora.go.th
Chom Pluak	3,059	jompluak.go.th
Kradangnga	2,981	
Bang Phrom	2,626	bangprom.go.th

Bang Sakae-SAO	Pop.	bangsakae.go.th
Bang Sakae	1,912	
Ban Promote	1,685	
Total	3,597	

Rong Hip-SAO	Pop.	rongheep.go.th
Rong Hip	2,013	
Bang Kung	1,530	
Total	3,543	

Bang Khonthi-SAO	Pop.	bangkhontee.go.th
Bang Khonthi	1,782	
Yai Phaeng	1,427	
Total	3,209	

== Healthcare ==
=== Hospital ===
There is Napalai hospital in Kradangnga subdistrict with 90 beds.

=== Health promoting hospitals ===
There are total thirteen health-promoting hospitals in the district, of which; one in every subdistrict but Don Manora subdistrict has two.

== Religion ==
There are twenty-five Theravada Buddhist temples in the district.
One in Bang Sakae, Don Manora, Chom Pluak, Bang Krabue and Bang Pramote, two in Bang Khonthi, Bang Phrom and Bang Nok Khwaek, three in Rong Hip, five in Bang Kung, six in Kradangnga.

== Sights ==
Bang Nok Khwaek is the centre of the Roman Catholic Diocese of Ratchaburi. The Nativity of Our Lady Cathedral was built in 1890 in French Gothic style.

Khai Bang Kung is a former river fort, which was of great importance during the late Ayutthaya and Thonburi periods. After being deserted for almost 200 years, a Boy Scout camp was established at the site in 1967, and a shrine was built commemorating King Taksin.

Wat Charoen Sukharam Worawihan is the most important Buddhist temple in the district. The main Buddha figure in the Ubosot (ordination hall) is called Luang Pho Toa. It consists of a laterite core covered with plaster and gilded, and is in the style of the Sukhothai period.

== Gallery ==
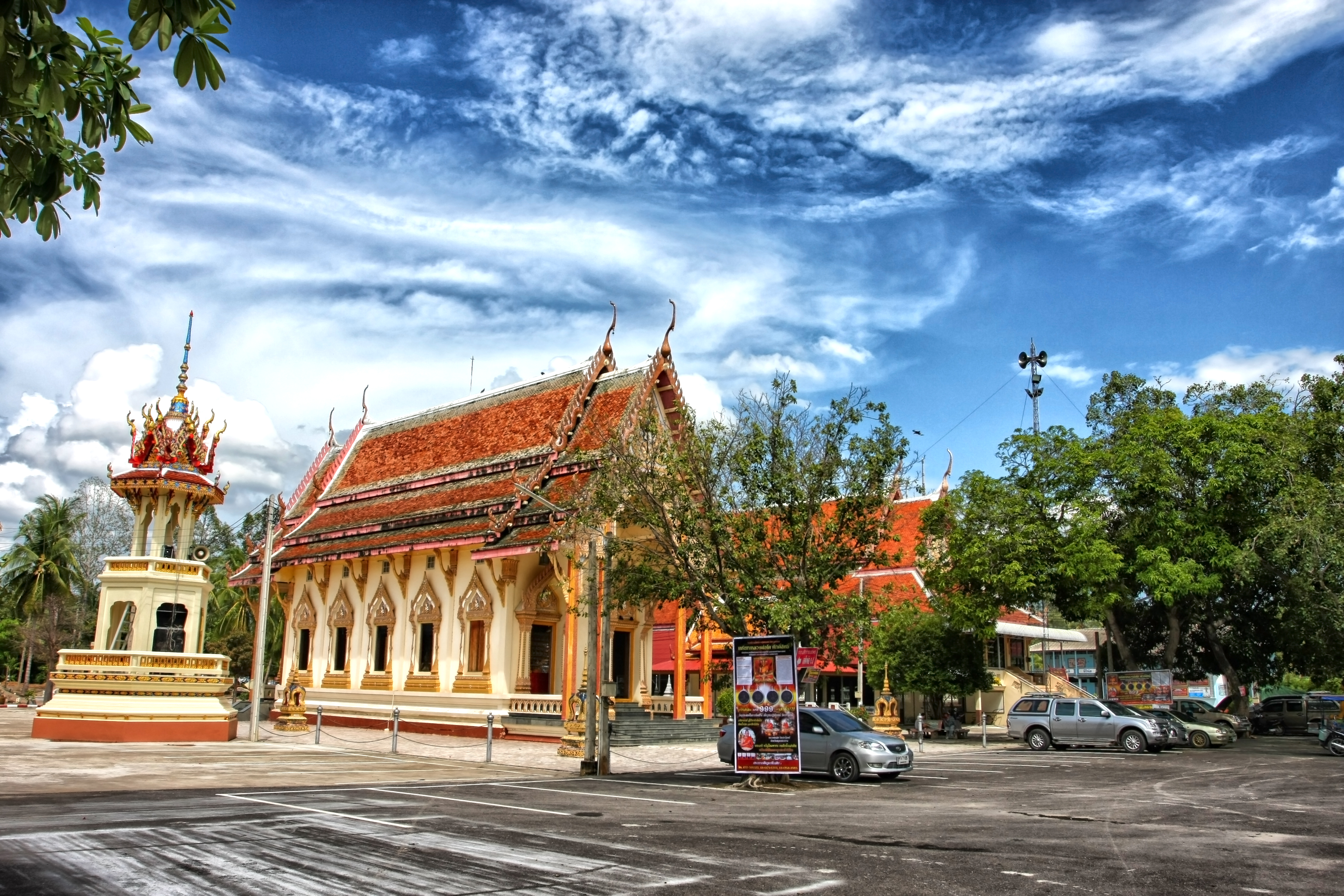
Wat Pramot, tambon Ban Pramot

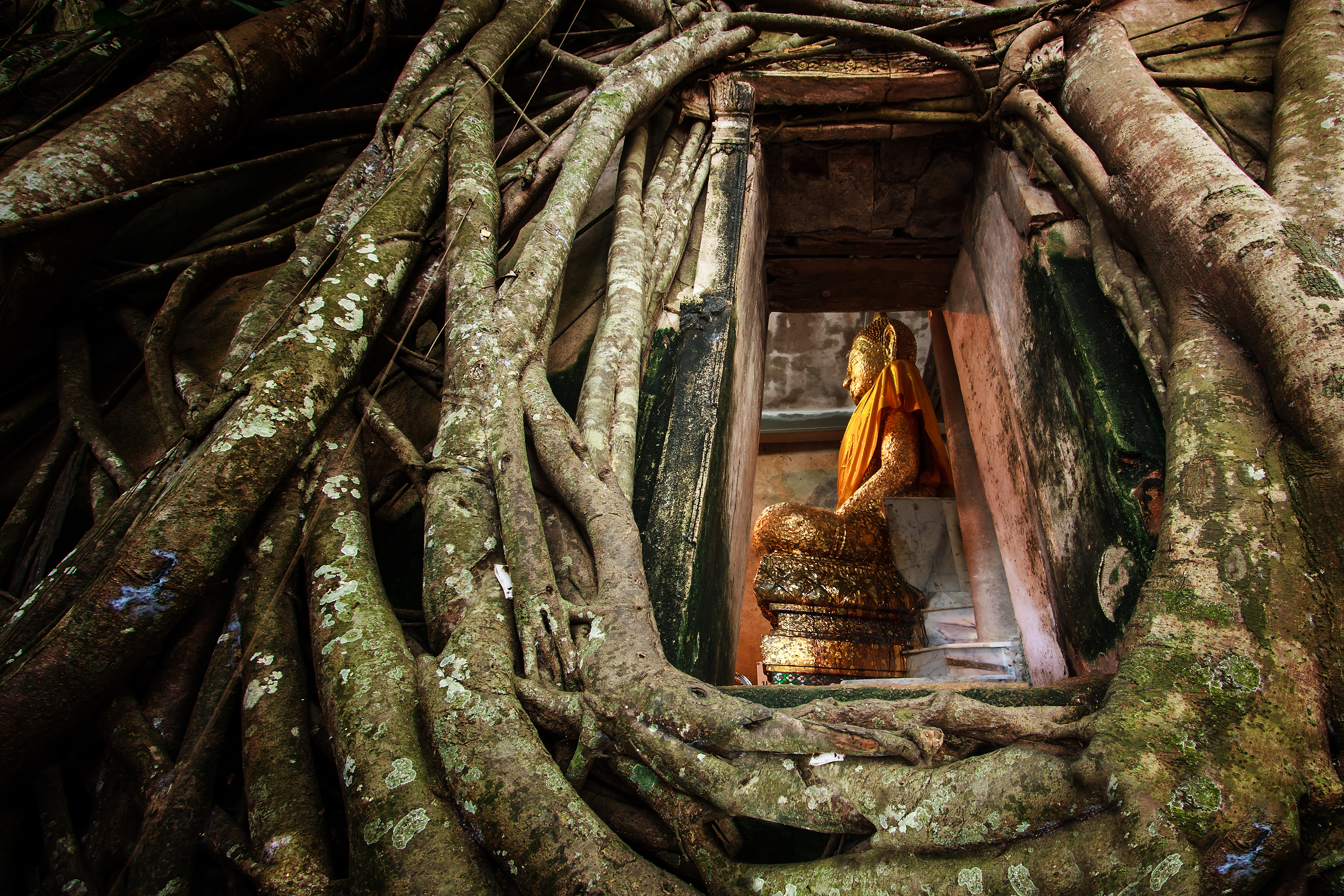
Wat Bang Kung, tambon Bang Kung

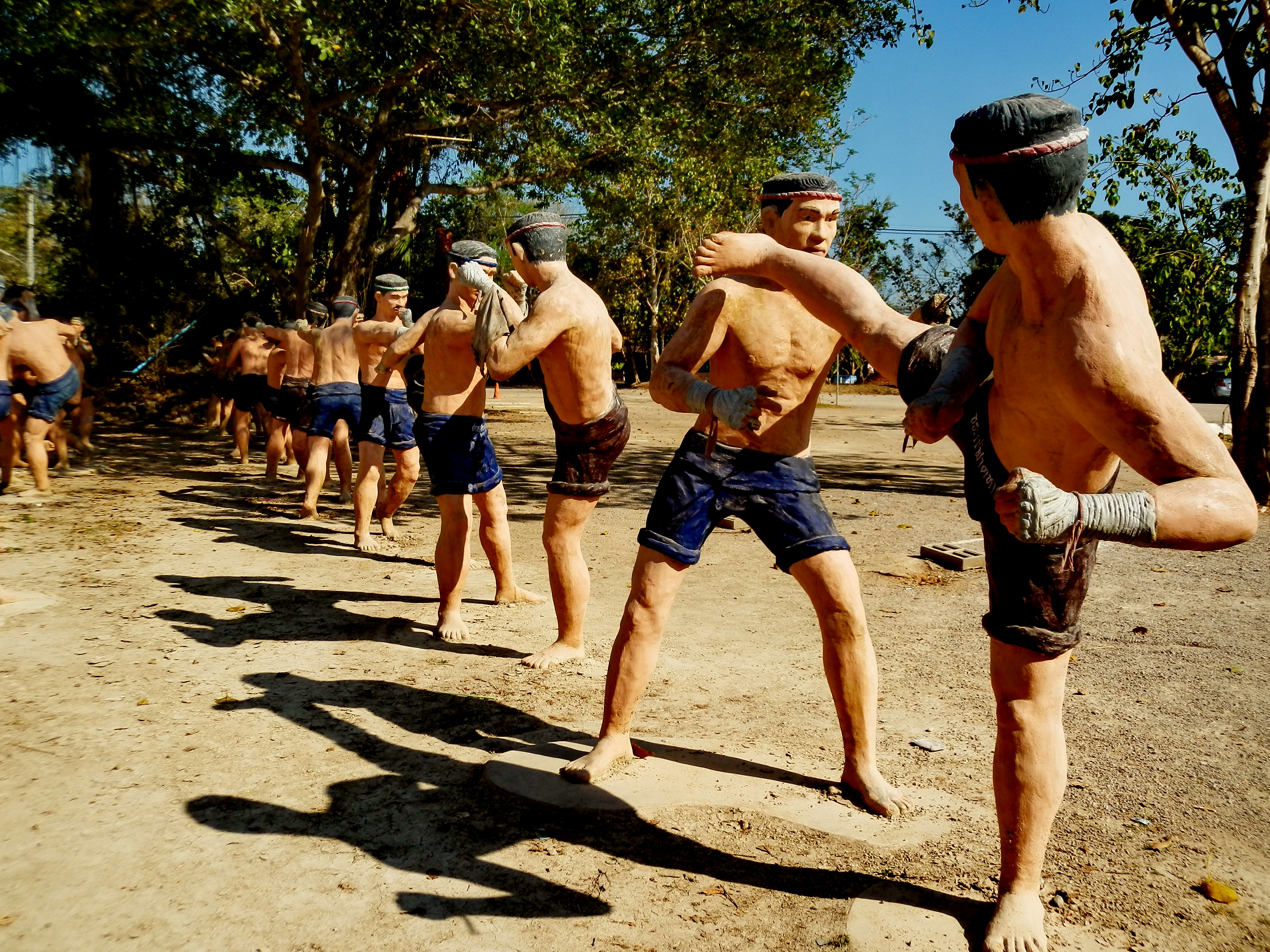
Bang Kung camp, tambon Bang Kung

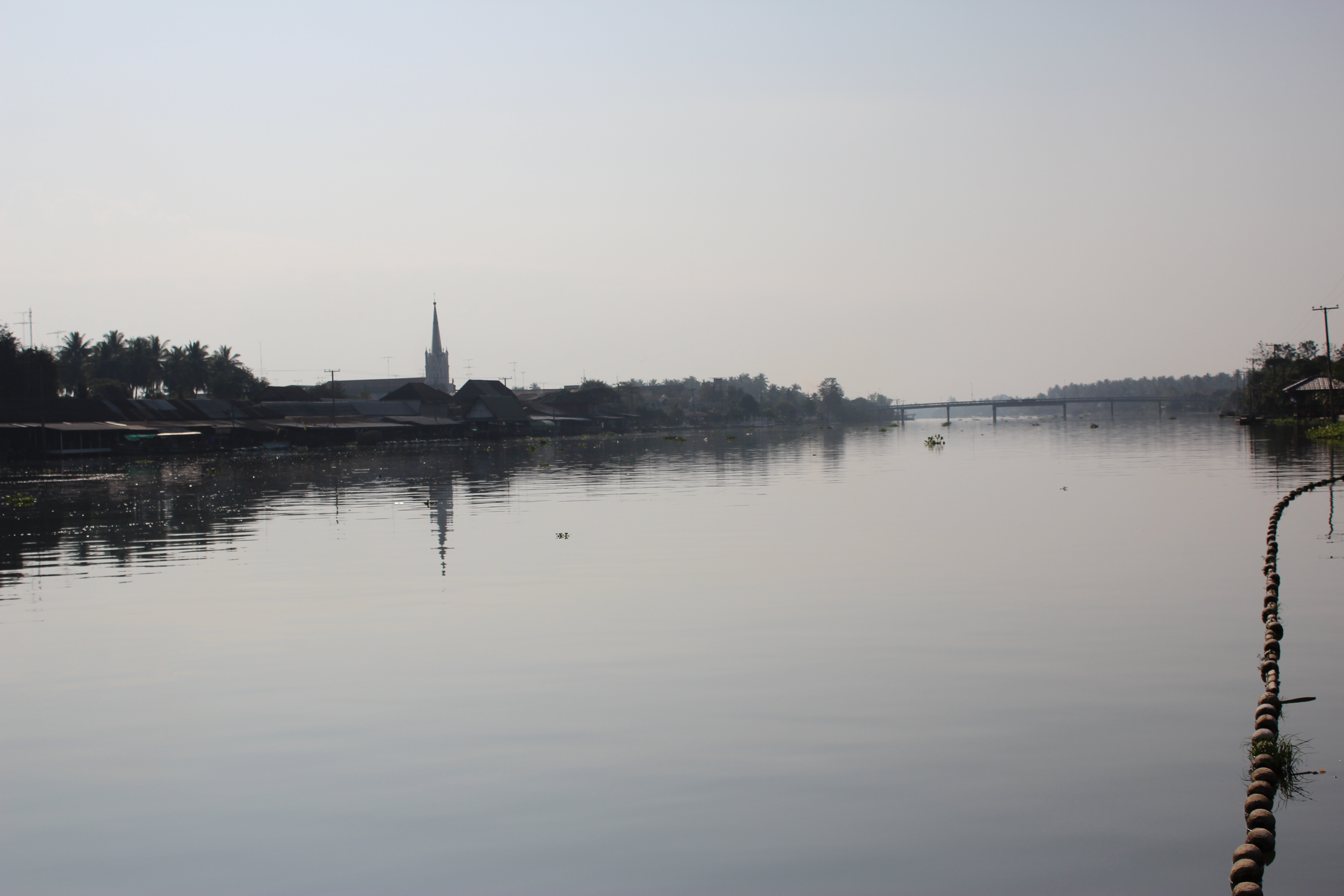
Mae Klong river

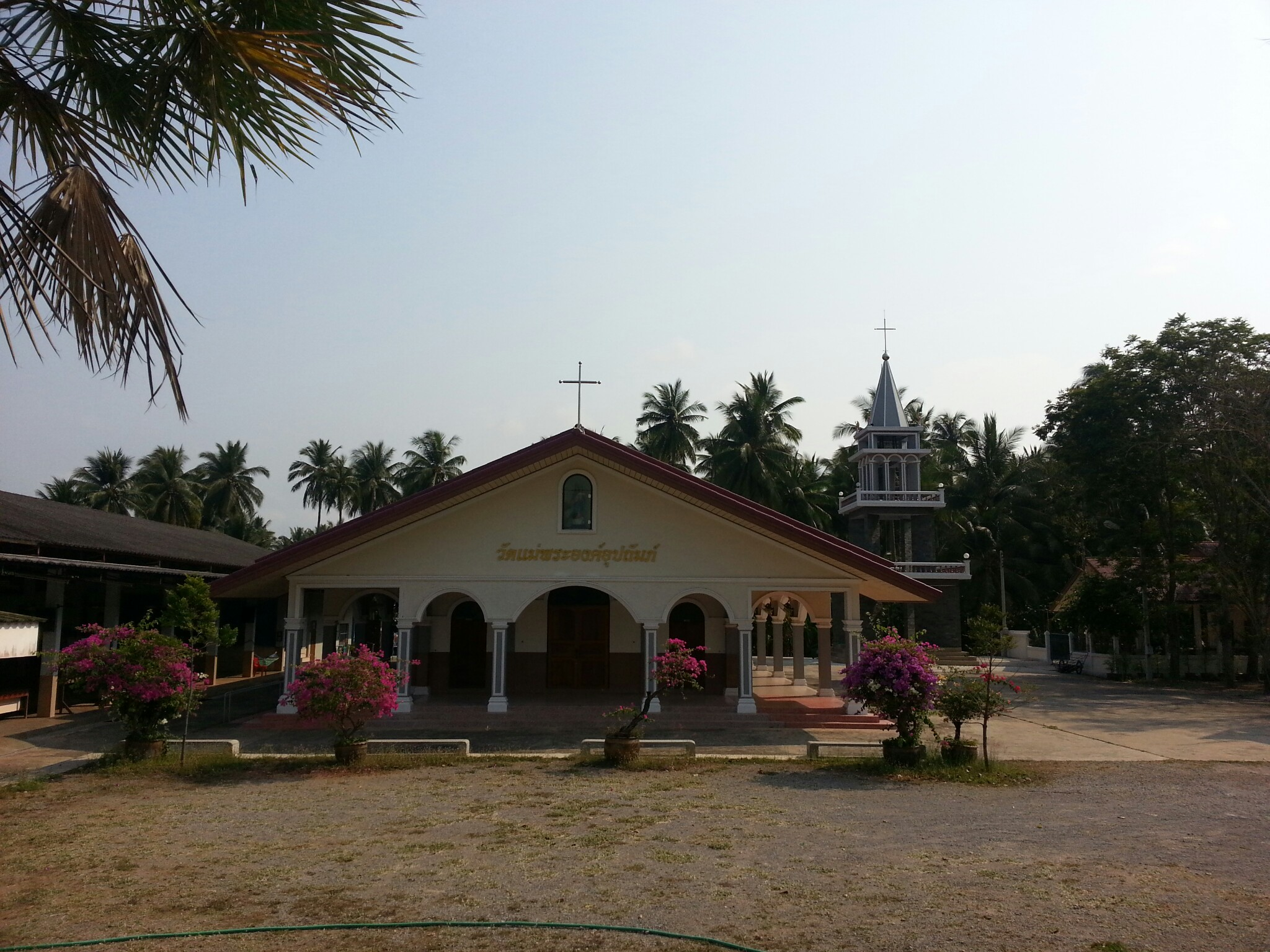
Catholic church at tambon Bang Yi Rong

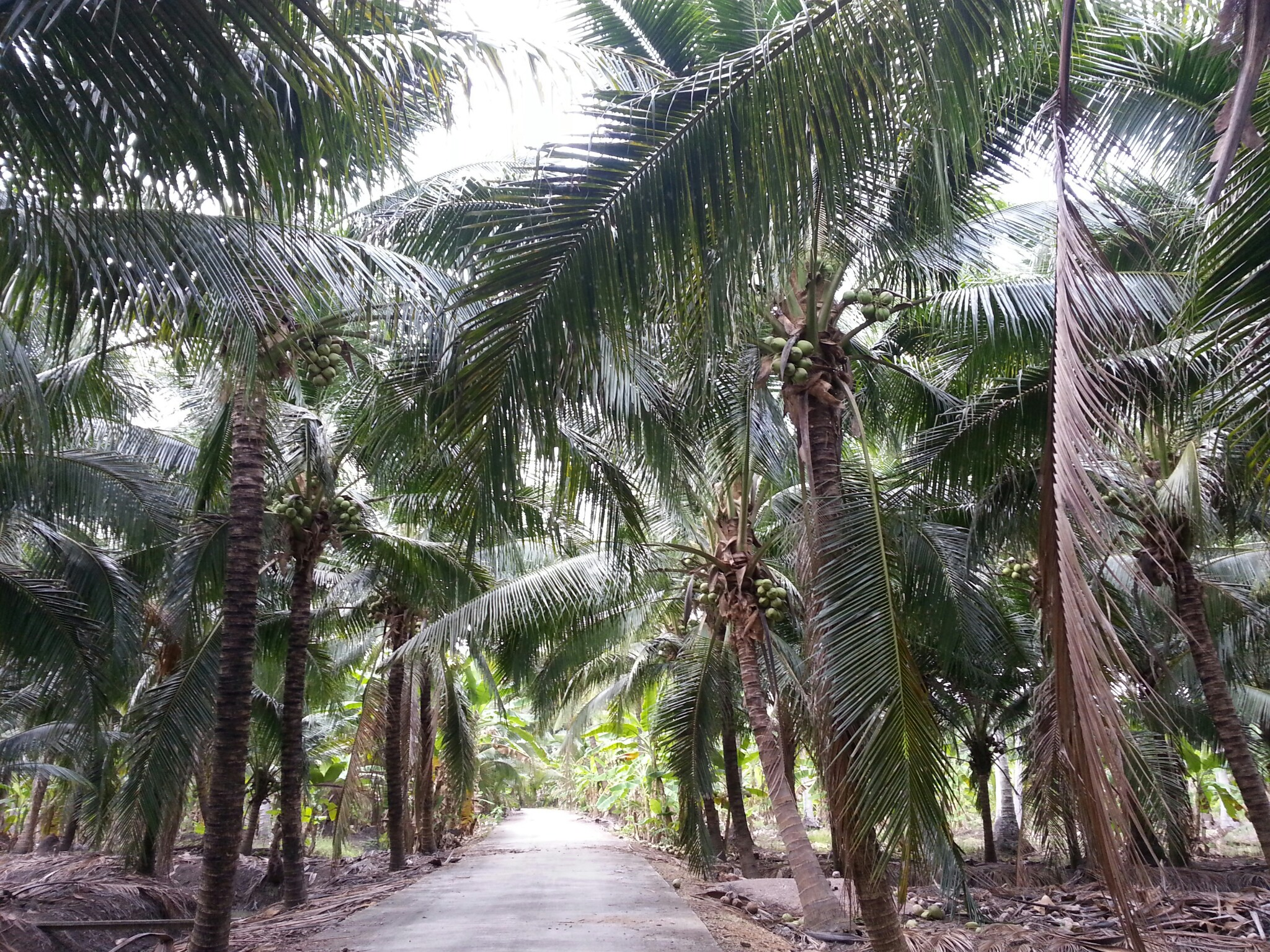
Coconut plantation at tambon Bang Yi Rong

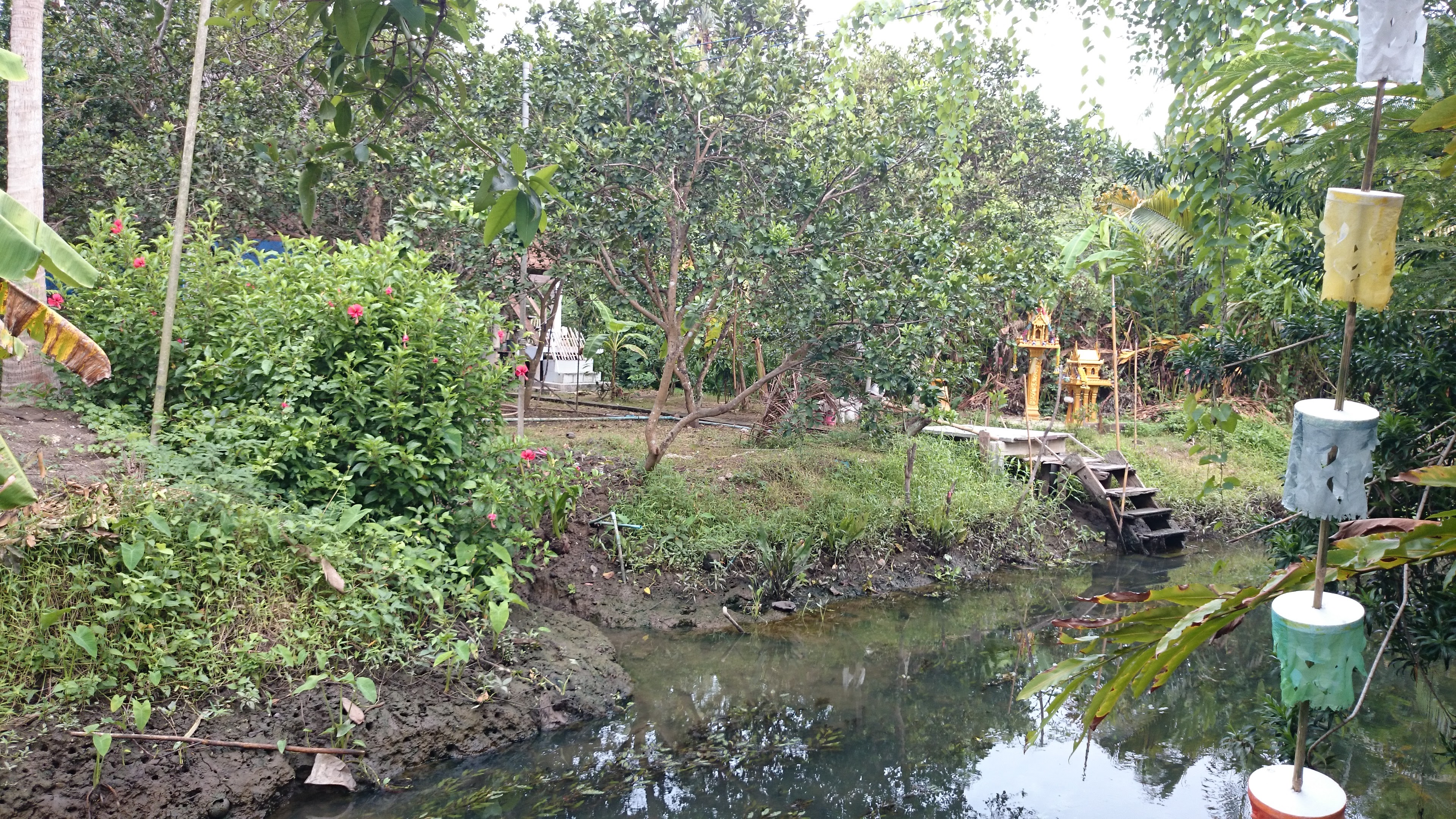
Orchard at tambon Kradangnga
