= Panya Kritcharoen =

Thai Roman Catholic prelate (1949–2025)

Most Reverend Panya Kritcharoen
- Bishop Emeritus of Ratchaburi
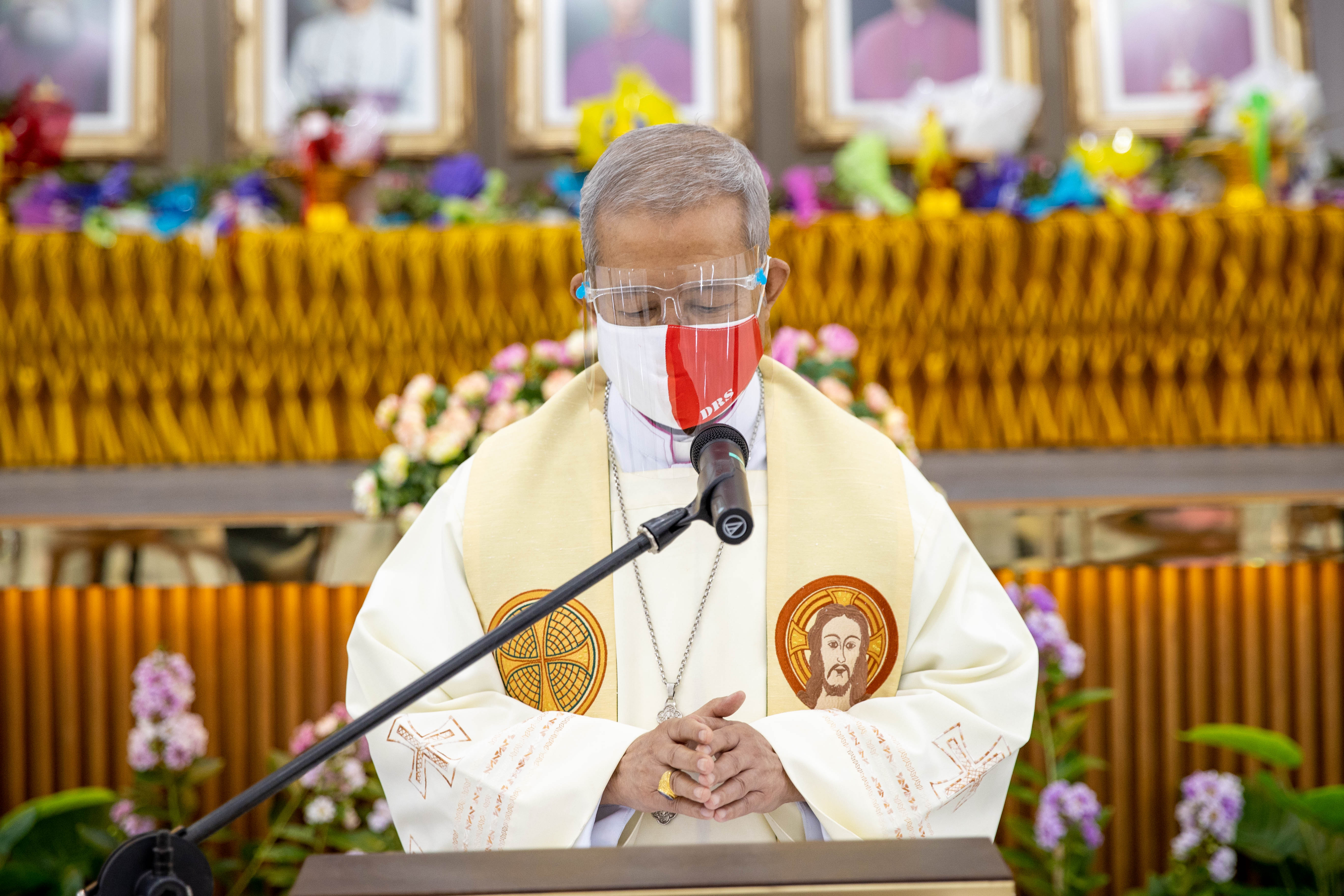
- Archdiocese: Bangkok
- Diocese: Ratchaburi
- Appointed: 18 March 2005
- Term ended: 13 June 2023
- Predecessor: John Bosco Manat Chuabsamai
- Successor: Silvio Siripong Charatsri

Orders
- Ordination: 22 May 1976
- Consecration: 28 May 2005 by Michael Michai Kitbunchu

Personal details
- Born: 18 December 1949 Bangtan-Banpong, Thailand
- Died: 6 January 2025 (aged 75)
- Motto: Ut unum sint
- Coat of arms

Styles of Panya Kritcharoen
- Reference style: His Excellency; The Most Reverend
- Spoken style: Your Excellency
- Religious style: Bishop

The Most Reverend John Bosco Panya Kritcharoen (Thai: ปัญญา กฤษเจริญ; 18 December 1949 – 6 January 2025) was a Thai Catholic prelate who was bishop emeritus of the diocese of Ratchaburi in Thailand.

== Biography ==
Born in Bangtan-Banpong, Ratchaburi province, he studied in Thailand and the United States. He was ordained as priest on May 22, 1976, in Ratchaburi, and then worked as assistant priest, parish priest, as well as school headmaster, rector of the diocesan minor seminary, director of the Centre for Evangelisation, member of the Commission for the Pontifical Mission Societies, president of the Commission for Evangelisation of Peoples and pastoral care for health workers.

While serving as parish priest of Chombung, he was appointed the bishop of the diocese of Ratchaburi by Pope John Paul II on 18 March 2005. He was consecrated on May 28 of the same year by Cardinal Michael Michai Kitbunchu.

Pope Francis accepted his resignation from the pastoral care of the diocese of Ratchaburi on 13 June 2023.

Kritcharoen died on 6 January 2025, at the age of 75.

Catholic Church titles
Preceded by John Bosco Manat Chuabsamai	Bishop of Ratchaburi; 2005–2023	Succeeded by Silvio Siripong Charatsri
