= Diocese of Ratchaburi =

Roman Catholic diocese in Thailand

Diocese of Ratchaburi Diœcesis Ratchaburensis สังฆมณฑลราชบุรี

Location
- Country: Thailand
- Ecclesiastical province: Bangkok
- Metropolitan: Bangkok

Statistics
- Area: 31,362 km^{2} (12,109 sq mi)
- Population: Total; Catholics: (as of 2004); 2,327,381; 15,730 (0.7%)

Information
- Denomination: Catholic
- Sui iuris church: Latin Church
- Rite: Roman Rite
- Cathedral: Cathedral of Nativity of Our Lady in Amphoe Bang Khonthi

Current leadership
- Pope: Leo XIV
- Bishop: Silvio Siripong Charatsri
- Metropolitan Archbishop: Francis Xavier Vira Arpondratana

Map
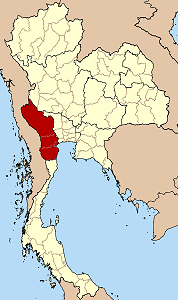
- Location of the Diocese of Ratchaburi

The Roman Catholic Diocese of Ratchaburi (Diœcesis Ratchaburensis, Thai: สังฆมณฑลราชบุรี) is a Latin suffragan diocese of the archdiocese of Bangkok in western central Thailand.

The diocese covers an area of 31,362 square kilometres (12,109 mi^{2}), covering four of the western provinces of Thailand: Ratchaburi, Phetchaburi, Kanchanaburi, and Samut Songkhram. As of 2001, of the 2.2 million citizens, 15,246 are members of the Catholic Church. It is divided into 17 parishes, having 71 priests altogether.

While the cathedral episcopal see dedicated to the Nativity of Our Lady is at Bang Nok Khwaek, the diocesan center is in the town of Ratchaburi.

== History ==
The diocese dates back to 30 June 1930, when the mission sui iuris of Rajaburi was created, originally responsible for the south and west of Thailand, on territory split off from the then Apostolic Vicariate of Bangkok (now its Metropolitan). It was run by the Salesian order, who came there in 1927 and supplied the missionary Ordinaries. The 18 missionaries took over a mission previously run by the Paris Foreign Missionaries.

On 28 May 1934 it was elevated to Apostolic Prefecture of Rajaburi; on 3 March 1941 to Apostolic Vicariate of Rajaburi, hence entitled to a titular bishop.

On 18 December 1965 it became the Diocese of Bangnokhuek. On 21 October 1966 it was renamed Diocese of Ratburi.

On 26 June 1969 the Diocese of Surat Thani was split off from the diocese (a fellow suffragan of Bangkok), which continued to be run by Salesians, while the remainder, again renamed Diocese of Ratchaburi, was since then under the responsibility of native priests.

== Cathedral ==
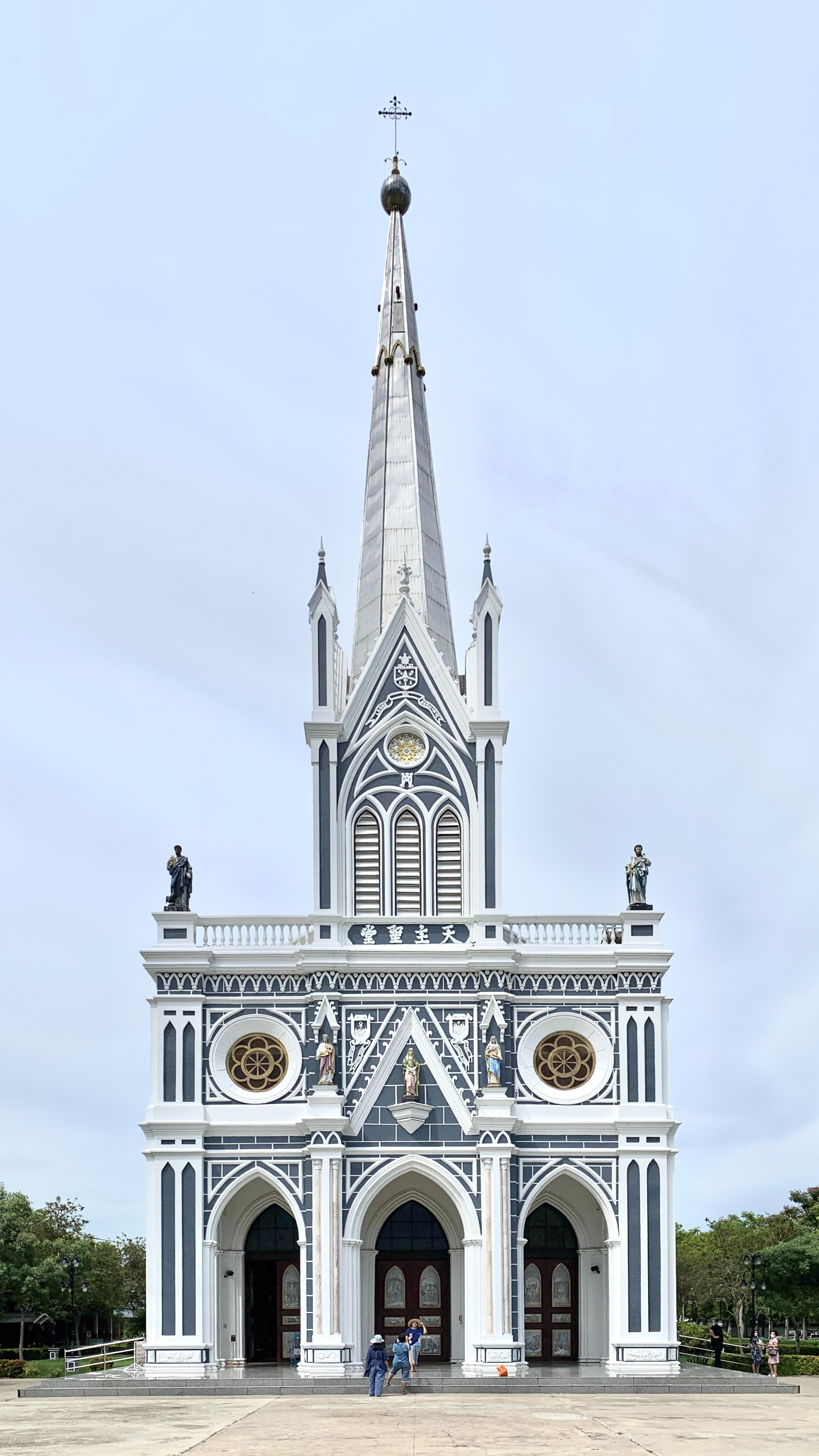
Nativity of Our Lady Cathedral

The cathedral of the diocese is the Nativity of Our Lady Cathedral (Thai: อาสนวิหารแม่พระบังเกิด). It is in Bang Nok Khwaek, Amphoe Bang Khonthi, Samut Songkhram Province. The church is built in French Gothic style and decorated with stained glass windows imported from France. In two rows these show scenes of the life of Jesus in top row, as well as holy people (men to the north, women to the south).

Around 1840 nine Chinese Catholic families moved to the rim of the Mae Klong River. The community grew to about 200 Catholics until 1847, when a first wooden church named Sala Daeng (Red Hall) or Raung Yao (Long Canal) was built near the site of the current cathedral. In 1850 Father Marin bought the land at the mouth of the Khlong Damnoen Saduak and donated it to the church.

In 1890 the French missionary Father Paulo Salmon started construction of the Nativity of Our Lady church, which was inaugurated on 2 February 1896. During World War II several of the windows broke, which took until 1993 to be fully repaired. In 1994-1999 a major renovation of the cathedral was undertaken, overseen by Father Pradit.

== Ordinaries ==
(all Roman Rite)

Ecclesiastical Superior of Rajaburi

- Gaétan Pasotti, Salesians (S.D.B.) (1931 – 1934.05.28 see below)

Apostolic Prefect of Rajaburi

- Gaétan Pasotti, S.D.B. (see above 1934.05.28 – 1941.04.03 see below)

Apostolic Vicars of Rajaburi

- Gaétan Pasotti, S.D.B. (see above 1941.04.03 – death 1950.09.03), Titular Bishop of Barata (1941.04.03 – 1950.09.03)
- (Pietro) Luigi Carretto, S.D.B. (1951.04.12 – 1965.12.18 see below), Titular Bishop of Zenobias (1951.04.12 – 1965.12.18)

Suffragan Bishop of Bangnokhuek

- Pietro Luigi Carretto, S.D.B. (see above 1965.12.18 – 1966.10.21 see below)

Suffragan Bishop of Ratburi

- Pietro Luigi Carretto, S.D.B. (see above 1966.10.21 – 1969.06.26), later Bishop of Surat Thani (Thailand) (1969.06.26 – 1988.06.21)

Suffragan Bishops of Ratchaburi

- Robert Ratna Bamrungtrakul (June 26, 1969 – April 28, 1975), also President of Bishops' Conference of Thailand (1973 – 1979); later bishop of Chiang Mai (1975.04.28 – 1986.10.17)
- Joseph Ek Thabping (October 2, 1975 – February 12, 1985 died)
- John Bosco Manat Chuabsamai (November 25, 1985 – July 24, 2003 resigned)
- Apostolic Administrator (2003.06.20 – 2005.03.18) Lawrence Thienchai Samanchit, while Bishop of Chanthaburi (Thailand) (1971.07.03 – 2009.04.04 retired)
- John Bosco Panya Kritcharoen (March 18, 2005 – June 13, 2023)
- Silvio Siripong Charatsri (June 13, 2023 – Present)

== See also ==
- Beata Mundi Regina
- Catholic Church in Thailand
