= Damnoen Saduak district =

Damnoen Saduak ดำเนินสะดวก
- District
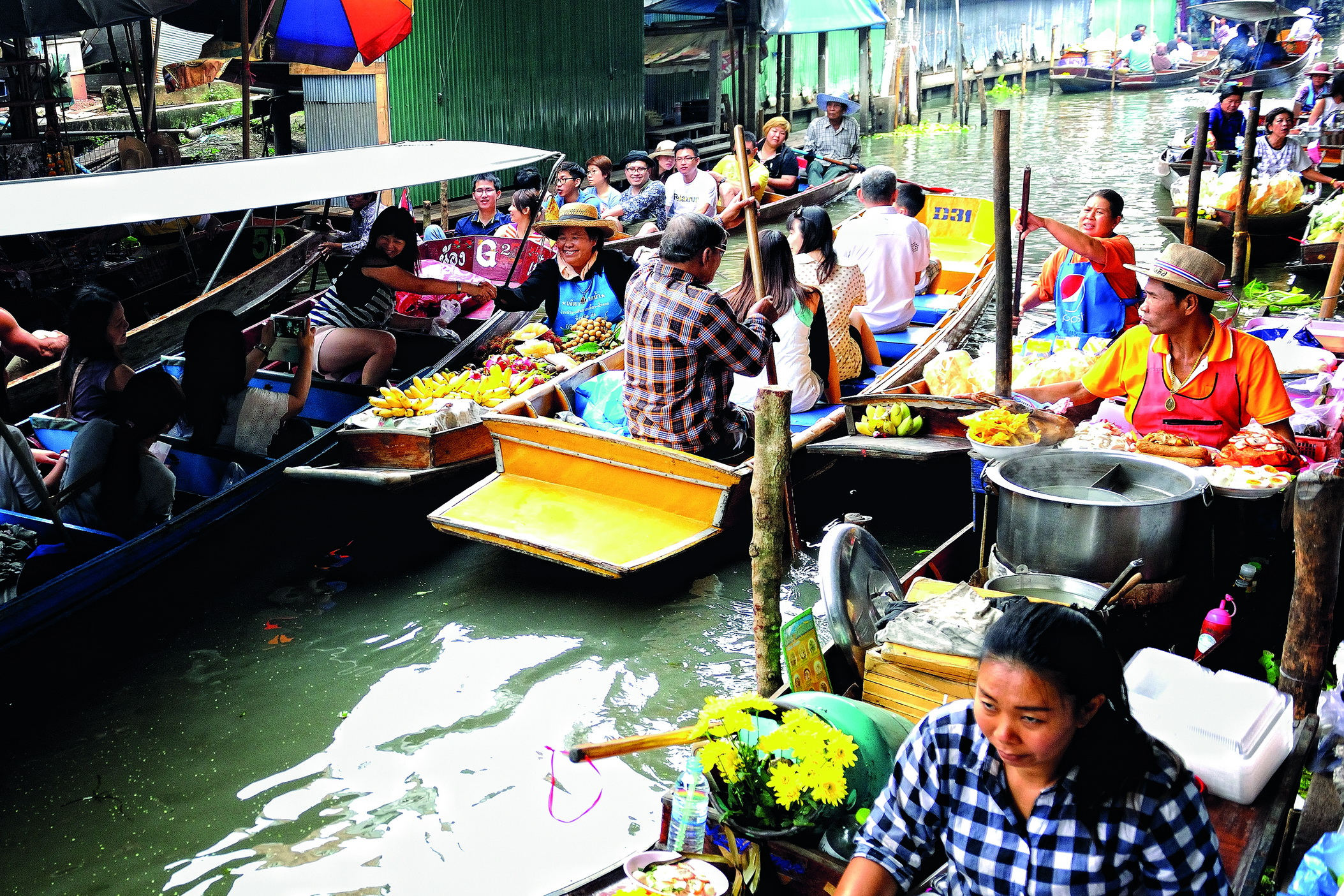
- Damnoen Saduak floating market, a famous local attraction

- District location in Ratchaburi province
- Coordinates: 13°31′3″N 99°57′17″E
- Country: Thailand
- Province: Ratchaburi
- Seat: Damnoen Saduak

Area
  - Total: 210.3 km^{2} (81.2 sq mi)

Population (2017)
  - Total: 93,264
  - Density: 443.48/km^{2} (1,148.6/sq mi)
- Time zone: UTC+7 (ICT)
- Postal code: 70130
- Geocode: 7004

Damnoen Saduak (Thai: ดำเนินสะดวก, pronounced [dām.nɤ̄ːn sā.dùak], often referred to simply as Damnoen, pronounced [dām.nɤ̄ːn]) is a district (amphoe) in western Thailand in Ratchaburi province. The central town is known for its floating market held every day till noon on a khlong not far from the district office.

== Geography ==
Neighbouring districts are (from the east clockwise): Ban Phaeo of Samut Sakhon province; Mueang Samut Songkhram and Bang Khonthi of Samut Songkhram province; Mueang Ratchaburi, Photharam, and Bang Phae of Ratchaburi province.

The district is crossed by the Khlong Damnoen Saduak, which connects the Tha Chin with the Mae Klong Rivers.

== History ==
Originally, most of the area in Damnoen Saduak was land. Local traveling was mainly by land route.

Until during the King Mongkut's reign (Rama IV), he ordered the Khlong Damnoen Saduak to be excavated to connect water transportation (its name literally 'comfortable travel'). It took two years to complete handled by Somdet Chaophraya Sri Suriwongse. The official inauguration ceremony took place in 1868 at Bang Nok Khwaek, its origin. Khlong Damnoen Saduak is a longest straight line man-made canal in Thailand, it links two rivers to facilitate transportation and trading routes as mentioned above. It also connects to the Khlong Phasi Charoen, which leads to the Chao Phraya River in the Bangkok area. Khlong Damnoen Saduak is about 35 km (21.7 mi) long, divided into eight milestones (at present, the remaining original area of Damnoen Saduak is the area of Don Phai sub-district).

Most of the workers were Chinese from southern China. When the canal was finished, they settled on two banks of the canal, resulting in the condition of the floating market and waterfront community as it appears today.

The occupation of Damnoen Saduak people in the past was mostly gardeners due to fertile land, they extended their new farmland to Khlong Damnoen Saduak. There were farmers working on their farms and others worked in transportation, at that time, there was no road, trading by waterways was very busy. There were many kinds of boats commuting in the canal, including large boats, medium-size boats, sampan boats, tugboats, wooden boats and others.

The originally local houses were made of wood. When a number of people moved into Damnoen Saduak areas, hence the houses are next to each other. There are pathways on both sides of the canal bridging all the houses, so it was easy to get by, creating a nature of the community. The geography of settlements facing each other along the waterways.

== Administration ==
=== Central administration ===
Damnoen Saduak is divided into 13 sub-districts (tambons), which are further subdivided into 105 administrative villages (mubans).

No.	Name	Thai	Villages	Pop.
1.	Damnoen Saduak	ดำเนินสะดวก	10	7,252
2.	Prasat Sit	ประสาทสิทธิ์	6	7,624
3.	Si Surat	ศรีสุราษฎร์	8	5,826
4.	Ta Luang	ตาหลวง	6	3,518
5.	Don Kruai	ดอนกรวย	12	15,385
6.	Don Khlang	ดอนคลัง	5	4,902
7.	Bua Ngam	บัวงาม	6	4,245
8.	Ban Rai	บ้านไร่	8	10,679
9.	Phaengphuai	แพงพวย	12	8,834
10.	Si Muen	สี่หมื่น	8	2,996
11.	Tha Nat	ท่านัด	8	7,873
12.	Khun Phithak	ขุนพิทักษ์	9	6,987
13.	Don Phai	ดอนไผ่	7	7,143

=== Local administration ===
There are five sub-district municipalities (thesaban tambons) in the district:

- Prasat Sit (Thai: เทศบาลตำบลประสาทสิทธิ์) consisting of parts of sub-district Prasat Sit.
- Bua Ngam (Thai: เทศบาลตำบลบัวงาม) consisting of sub-district Bua Ngam.
- Damnoen Saduak (Thai: เทศบาลตำบลดำเนินสะดวก) consisting of sub-district Damnoen Saduak and parts of sub-districts Si Surat, Ta Luang, Si Muen, and Tha Nat.
- Si Don Phai (Thai: เทศบาลตำบลศรีดอนไผ่) consisting of parts of sub-districts Prasat Sit, Si Surat, and Don Phai.
- Ban Rai (Thai: เทศบาลตำบลบ้านไร่) consisting of sub-district Ban Rai.

There are eight sub-district administrative organizations (SAO) in the district:

- Ta Luang (Thai: องค์การบริหารส่วนตำบลตาหลวง) consisting of parts of sub-district Ta Luang.
- Don Kruai (Thai: องค์การบริหารส่วนตำบลดอนกรวย) consisting of sub-district Don Kruai.
- Don Khlang (Thai: องค์การบริหารส่วนตำบลดอนคลัง) consisting of sub-district Don Khlang.
- Phaengphuai (Thai: องค์การบริหารส่วนตำบลแพงพวย) consisting of sub-district Phaengphuai.
- Si Muen (Thai: องค์การบริหารส่วนตำบลสี่หมื่น) consisting of parts of sub-district Si Muen.
- Tha Nat (Thai: องค์การบริหารส่วนตำบลท่านัด) consisting of parts of sub-district Tha Nat.
- Khun Phithak (Thai: องค์การบริหารส่วนตำบลขุนพิทักษ์) consisting of sub-district Khun Phithak.
- Don Phai (Thai: องค์การบริหารส่วนตำบลดอนไผ่) consisting of parts of sub-district Don Phai.

== Infrastructure ==
Damnoen Saduak is the location of Damnoen Saduak Floating Market.

Damnoen Saduak Hospital, a teaching hospital, is the district's main hospital, operated by the Ministry of Public Health.

== In popular culture ==
Damnoen Saduak is the setting of a Thai country song (luk thung), titled 'Damnoen Jaa' (ดำเนินจ๋า, "Oh Damnoen"). It was sung by Suraphol Sombatcharoen in the year 1966. It can be considered as one of his signature songs, which earned him the nickname "King of Luk Thung". The lyrics can be interpreted in two ways: describing the beauty of Damnoen girl, or mentioning his love for a woman named "Damnoen". However, this song is said to bring great pleasure to Damnoen Saduak resident.

The origin of this song took place on March 3, 1966, when four luk thung bands joined in a music contest in Damnoen Saduak. At that time, the result of the contest was judged from a garlands (phuang malai) and applause received from the audience. The band of Suraphol Sombatcharoen, who performed as the last, then they announced the first song he wrote especially for Damnoen people. It is titled "Damnoen Jaa", his band got lots of garlands from the first song. Then they continued with the second song "Nueng Nai Damnoen" (หนึ่งในดำเนิน, "One in Damnoen"), the audience poured their love to Sombatcharoen's band ever since.

For this reason, Damnoen Saduak is called "Nashville of Luk Thung".
