= Khlong Damnoen Saduak =

Canal in Thailand

Coordinates: 13°30′N 99°55′E

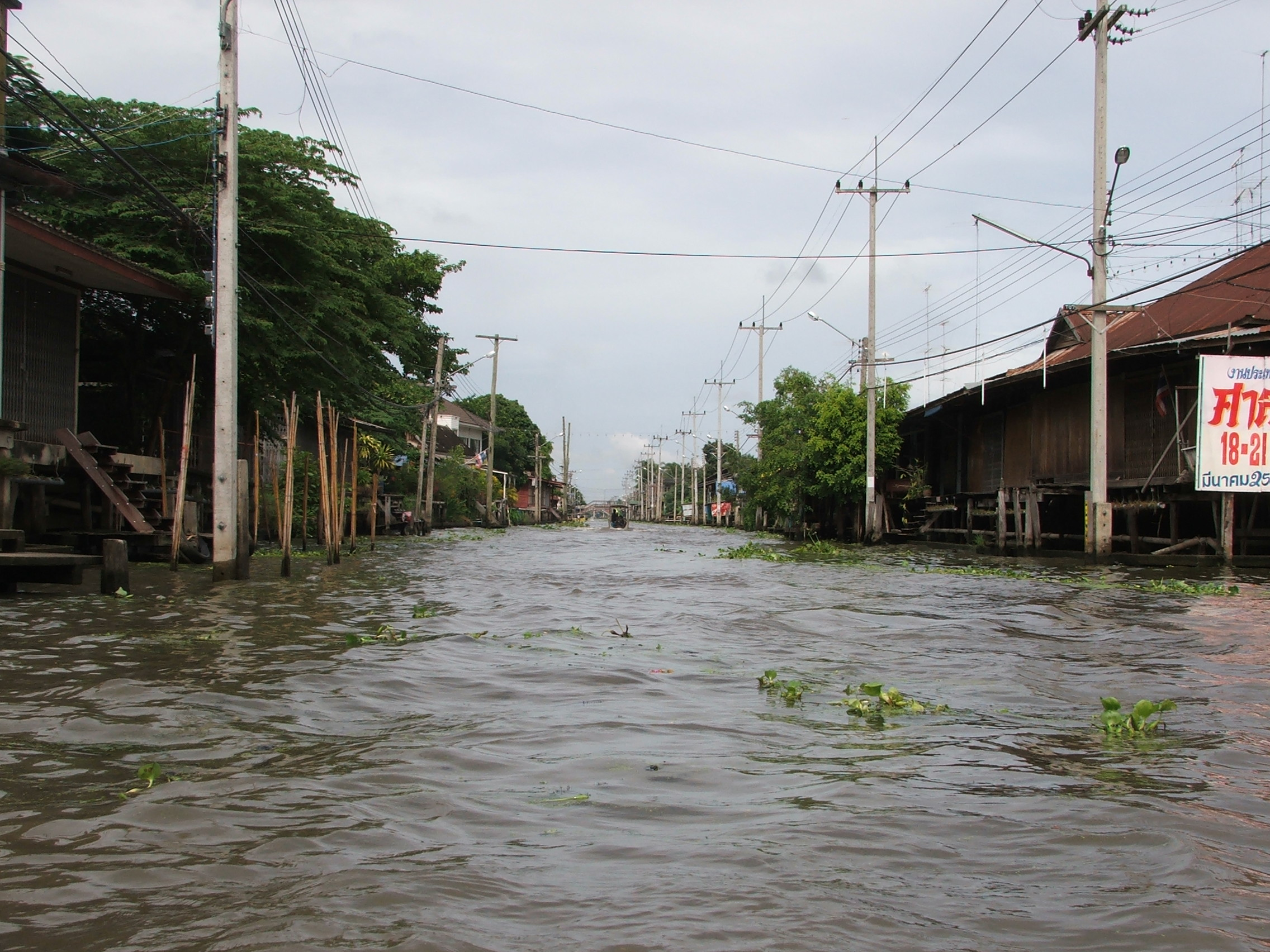
- Khlong Damnoen Saduak in the vicinity of Damnoen Saduak floating market
- Interactive map of Khlong Damnoen Saduak

Specifications
- Length: 35 km (22 miles)

History
- Construction began: Mongkut's reign

Geography
- Start point: Samut Sakhon
- End point: Samut Songkhram
- Connects to: Tha Chin and Mae Klong rivers

Khlong Damnoen Saduak (Thai: คลองดำเนินสะดวก, pronounced [kʰlɔ̄ːŋ dām.nɤ̄ːn sā.dùa̯k]) is a canal in western central Thailand. It links the Tha Chin and Mae Klong rivers, and has a length of approximately 35 km. The canal was built by order of King Mongkut. It was finished in 1868.

The most famous site along the canal is the Damnoen Saduak Floating Market. At the mouth of the canal to the Mae Klong is the catholic Nativity of Our Lady Cathedral, the principal church of the Diocese of Ratchaburi.

Khlong Damnoen Saduak is the longest straight man-made canal in Thailand, throughout the length of the canal, there is a milestone indicating the distance, which has a total of eight milestones. The distance of these milestones has also become the name of variously communities settled down along the waterways, such as Lak Sam (third milestone), Lak Ha (fifth milestone) in Ban Phaeo, Samut Sakhon, etc.

In addition to connecting the Tha Chin and Mae Klong rivers, Khlong Damnoen Saduak is also bridged to Khlong Phasi Charoen as well, which is the route leading to the Chao Phraya River in Bangkok. In the past, some vendors rowed boats from Damnoen Saduak or neighbouring districts to sell their goods at the pier in front of Wat Kanlayanamit in Bangkok's Thonburi side.
