= Bang Phae district =

Bang Phae บางแพ
- District
- District location in Ratchaburi province
- Coordinates: 13°41′29″N 99°55′49″E
- Country: Thailand
- Province: Ratchaburi
- Seat: Bang Phae
- District established: 1914

Area
  - Total: 172.596 km^{2} (66.640 sq mi)

Population (2017)
  - Total: 44,768
  - Density: 259.38/km^{2} (671.8/sq mi)
- Time zone: UTC+7 (ICT)
- Postal code: 70160
- Geocode: 7006

Bang Phae (Thai: บางแพ, pronounced [bāːŋ pʰɛ̄ː]) is a district (amphoe) in the eastern part of Ratchaburi province, western Thailand.

== History ==
The district was created in the year 1914 from 17 tambons from the districts Ban Pong, Photharam, and Damnoen Saduak. At first a temporary district office was located in a pavilion of Wat Hua Pho in tambon Hua Pho. Originally named Lam Phraya (ลำพระยา), it was renamed Hua Pho in 1917. In 1939 it was renamed Bang Phae, following the location of the district office since 1918.

== Geography ==
Neighbouring districts are (from the south clockwise), Damnoen Saduak and Photharam of Ratchaburi Province; Mueang Nakhon Pathom and Sam Phran of Nakhon Pathom province; and Ban Phaeo of Samut Sakhon province.

== Administration ==
The district is divided into seven sub-districts (tambons), which are further subdivided into 65 villages (mubans). There are two sub-district municipalities (thesaban tambons). Bang Phae covers tambons Bang Phae and Wang Yen, and Pho Hak the tambon Pho Hak. There are a further four tambon administrative organizations (TAO).

No.	Name	Thai	Pop.
1.	Bang Phae	บางแพ	8,246
2.	Wang Yen	วังเย็น	7,905
3.	Hua Pho	หัวโพ	4,688
4.	Wat Kaeo	วัดแก้ว	5,838
5.	Don Yai	ดอนใหญ่	3,904
6.	Don Kha	ดอนคา	3,558
7.	Pho Hak	โพหัก	10,629

== State of society ==
Bang Phae is a district in Ratchaburi Province, Thailand with residential and agricultural communities.

== Economy ==
Bang Phae is considered the largest giant freshwater prawn (domestically known as river prawn, or indigo claws prawn) farming site in the country. Because it is a watershed source that receives water released from the Srinakarin Dam in Kanchanaburi province in the upper part.
