= Bang Nok Khwaek =

Bang Nok Khwaek บางนกแขวก
- Tambon
- Seal
- Country: Thailand
- Province: Samut Songkhram
- District: Bang Khonthi

Government
  - Type: Subdistrict Municipality

Area
  - Total: 3.73 km^{2} (1.44 sq mi)

Population (2023)
  - Total: 1,280
  - Density: 343/km^{2} (890/sq mi)
- Time zone: UTC+7 (ICT)
- Postal code: 75120
- Calling code: 034
- ISO 3166 code: TH-750210
- Website: bnk.go.th

Bang Nok Khwaek (Thai: บางนกแขวก, pronounced [bāːŋ nók kʰwɛ̀ːk]) is a subdistrict (tambon) of Bang Khonthi district, Samut Songkhram province, central Thailand.

== History ==
Originally, this area was called "Ban Pho Ngam" (บ้านโพธิ์งาม), but because there are many black-crowned night herons (Nycticorax nycticorax) to live. The locals therefore changed the name to "Bang Nok Khwaek" like today, which means "place of black-crowned night herons". In addition, this species of bird is also used as a seal of the district.

Later, during World War II, the Imperial Japanese Army had bombed Bang Nok Khwaek Watergate, in order not to transfer oil through, but did not damage anything. This is believed to be a miracle from the local sacred Buddha image namely Luang Pho To (หลวงพ่อโต) that provides protection.

== Geography ==
Most of the area consisting of lowlands along the Mae Klong River with rivers and khlongs flowing through thus making the soil fertile suitable for planting. Most areas are orchards. Bang Nok Khwaek regarded as the northernmost part of the district.

Neighboring subdistricts are (from the north clockwise): Si Muen of Damnoen Saduak district, Ratchaburi province, Bang Khonthi, and Bang Yi Rong of its district, respectively.

== Administration ==
=== Central government ===
The administration of Bang Nok Khwaek subdistrict is responsible for an area that covers 3.73 square kilometres (1.44 sq mi) and consists of seven villages (muban), as of December 2023: 1,280 people and 678 households.

Village	Name	People
Moo1	Bang Nok Khwaek	77
Moo2	Bang Nok Khwaek	192
Moo3	Bang Nok Khwaek	172
Moo4	Bang Nok Khwaek	161
Moo5	Bang Nok Khwaek	242
Moo6	Bang Nok Khwaek	83
Moo7	Bang Nok Khwaek	353
	Total	1,280

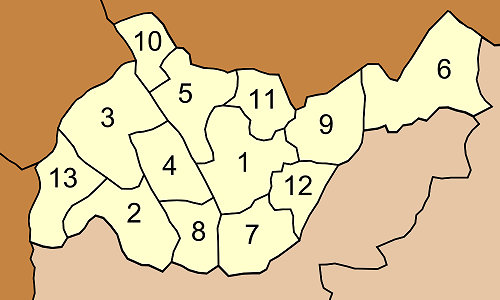
Map of Bang Khonthi district Bang Nok Khwaek is no. 10

=== Local government ===
As of December 2023 there is Bang Nok Khwaek subdistrict municipality (thesaban tambon),
which covers the whole subdistrict and village 6 of Bang Khonthi subdistrict.

Bang Nok Khwaek subdistrict municipality	Pop.	bnk.go.th
Bang Nok Khwaek	1,280	
Bang Khonthi	426	
Total	1,706	

== Healthcare ==
There is Bang Nok Kwhaek health-promoting hospital in Moo4.

== Temples ==
The following active temples, where Theravada Buddhism is practised by local residents:

Temple name	Thai
Wat Charoen Sukharam	วัดเจริญสุขาราม
Wat Pho Ngam	วัดโพธ์งาม

== Sights ==
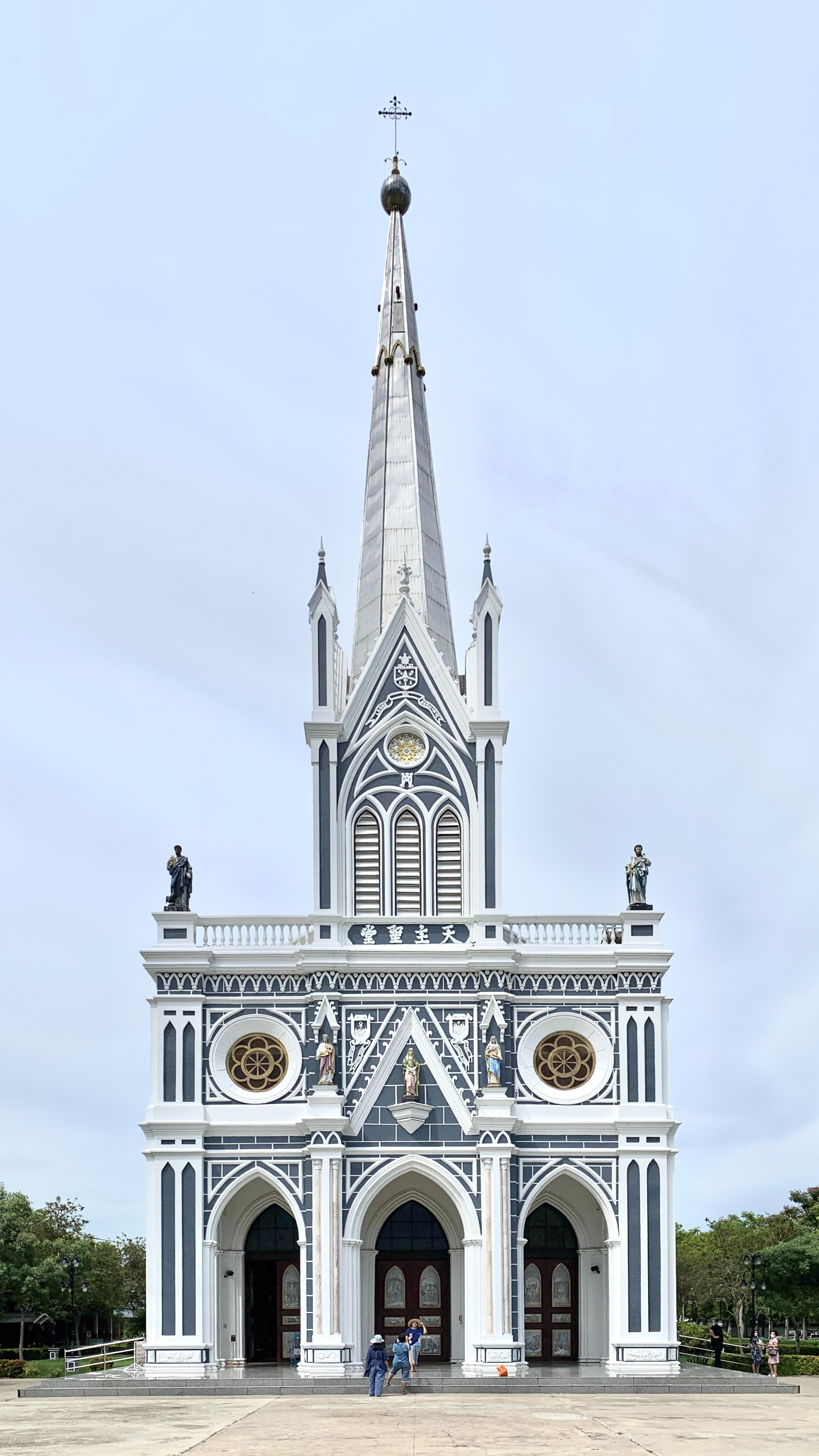
Nativity of Our Lady Cathedral, Bang Nok Khwaek

At present, Bang Nok Khwaek is well known as a tourist attraction in Samut Songkhram province. There are many interesting places include:

- Nativity of Our Lady Cathedral, one of the most beautiful and highest Catholic churches in Thailand, located on the bank of Mae Khlong River, it is more than 100 years old, using the French Gothic style of art.
- Bang Nok Khwaek Floating Market, a local market and historic community, with over 100th years of history on the Mae Klong River. Considered the only floating market in Thailand that is adjacent to the main river.
- Wat Charoen Sukaram Worawiharn, a royal Thai temple which is a sacred Buddha image enshrined, Luang Pho To, located about 18 km (11 mi) away from the downtown Samut Songkhram.
- Another interesting thing here is its natural fish sanctuary, a habitat of hundreds of thousands of Java barb (Barbonymus gonionotus), and red tailed tinfoil (B. altus), including some giant gourami (Osphronemus goramy). The giant gourami here are special abilities, they can eat rice noodles or pork balls from the vendor's hand.

== Local products ==
- Thai sweets
- Biodiesel
- Fruit preserves
- Authentic coconut oil

== Notable people ==
- Phin Choonhavan, military and politician
- Apidej Sit-Hirun, Muay Thai kickboxer and professional boxer
