= Thai farmer's hat =

Traditional Thai straw hat

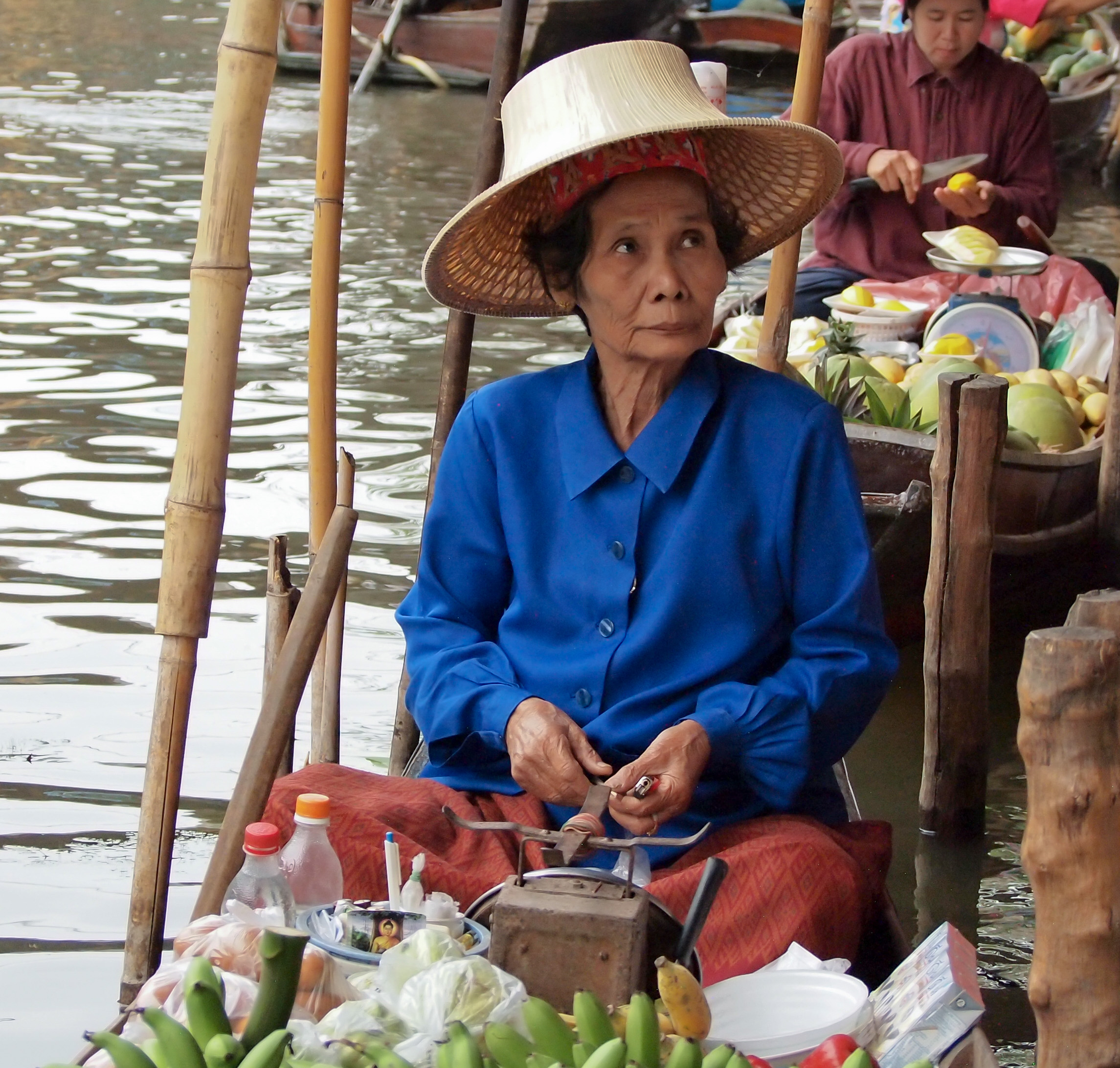
Woman wearing a ngob, Damnoen Saduak Floating Market

The Thai farmer's hat or ngob (Thai: งอบ, pronounced [ŋɔ̂ːp], RTGS: ngop, also spelled ngorb), is a traditional hat used in Thailand. More complex in design than the related Asian conical hat, the ngob is made of ola palm leaves laid over a plaited bamboo-strip frame. The frame includes an inner band which fits around the wearer's head, creating space for air circulation.

Today, the largest centre of ngob production lies in Bang Pahan District in Phra Nakhon Si Ayutthaya Province, where it is a well-known OTOP product in many villages. Ngob from Bang Pahan are sold all over the country. However, there has been a gradual decline in its use, as traditional agriculture methods have become supplanted by technology.

The ngob's shape was the inspiration for the design of the Thailand pavilion at Expo 2015 in Milan.
