= Nativity of Our Lady Cathedral, Bang Nok Khwaek =

Coordinates: 13.4953°N 99.9236°E

Nativity of Our Lady Cathedral
- อาสนวิหารแม่พระบังเกิด บางนกแขวก
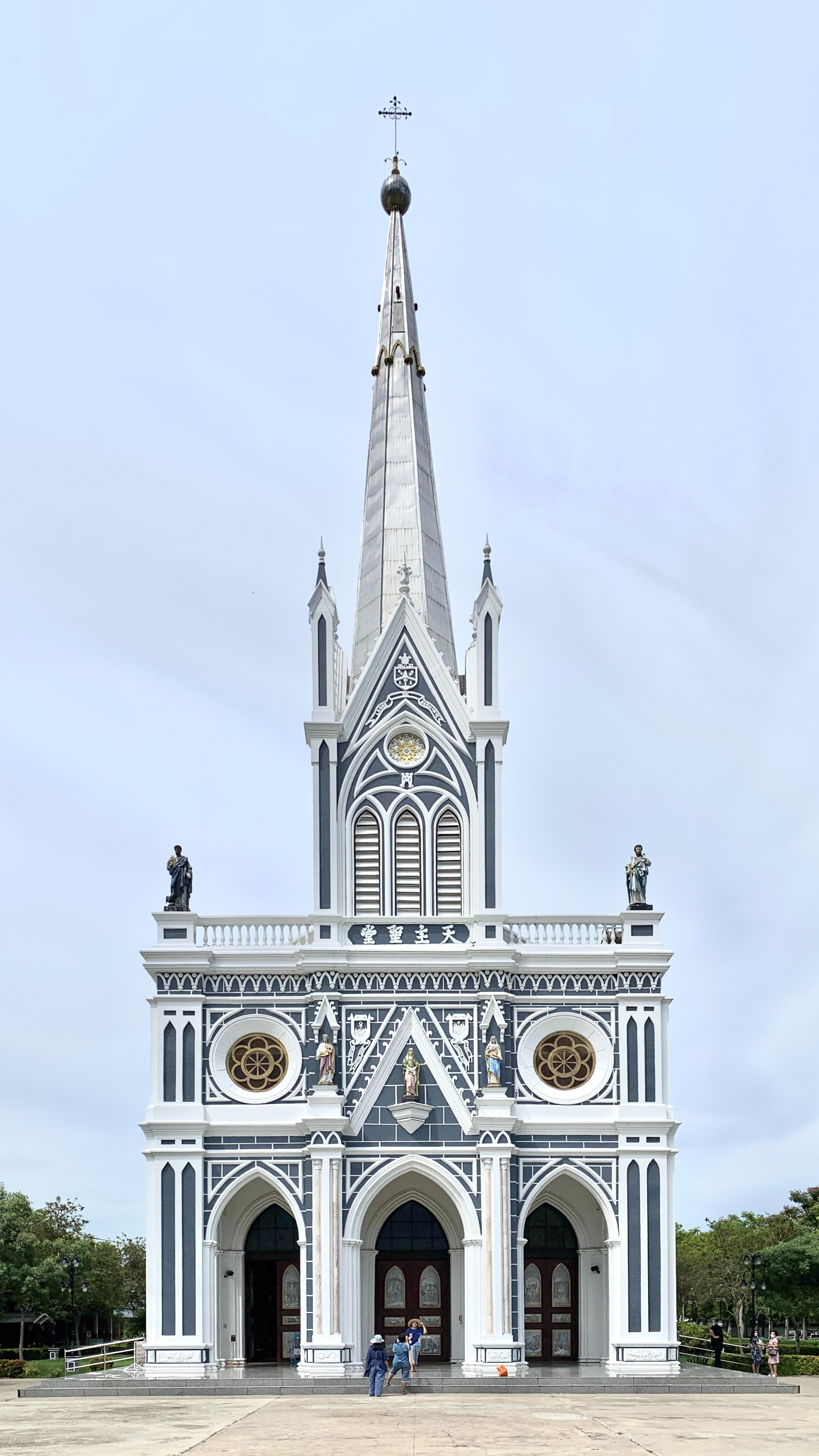
- Nativity of Our Lady Cathedral
- Location: Bang Khonthi
- Country: Thailand
- Denomination: Roman Catholic Church

History
- Founded: 1890
- Founder: Paolo Salmone

Architecture
- Style: Gothic Revival

Clergy
- Bishop: John Bosco Panya Kritcharoen (2005.03.18 – ...)

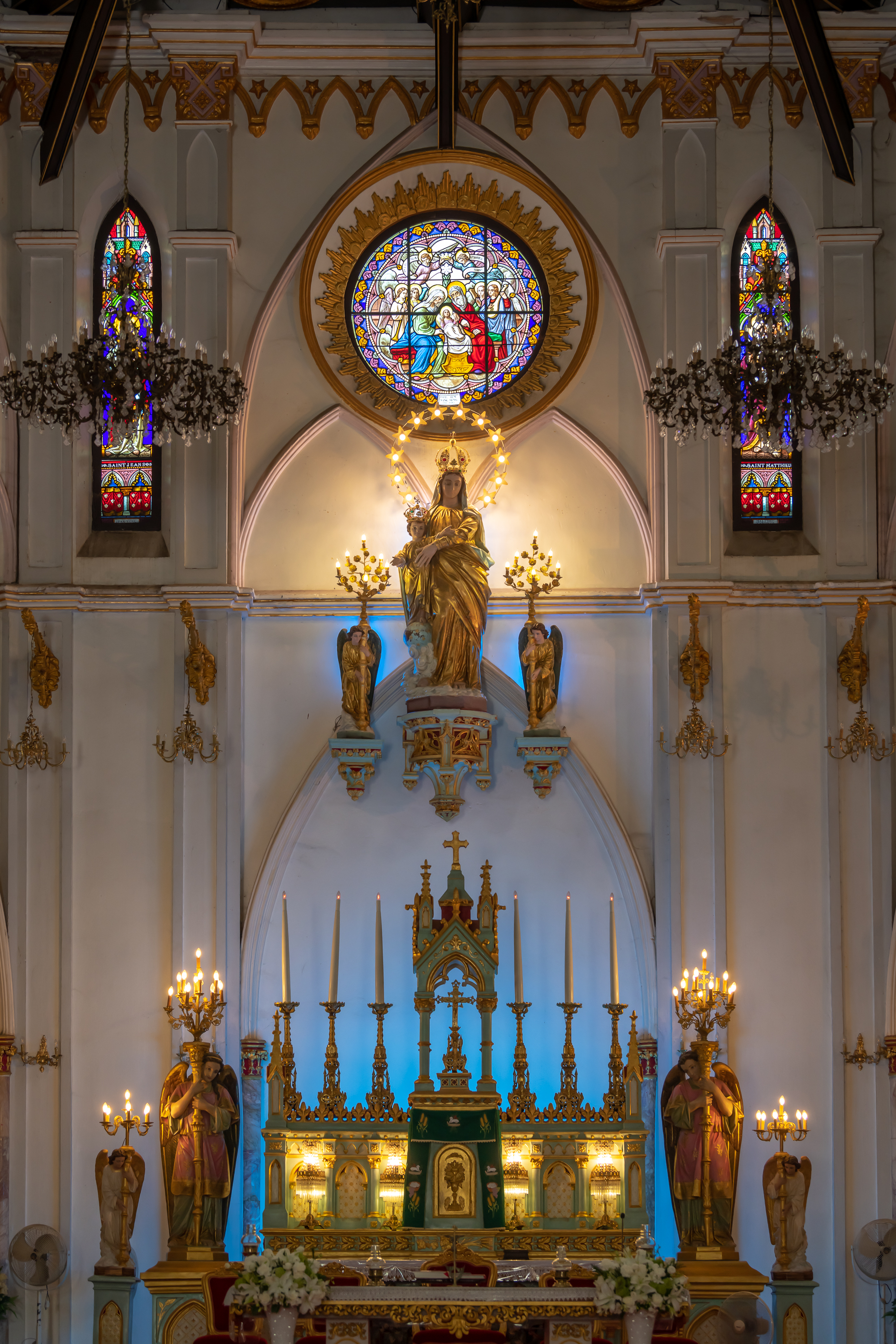
Nativity of Our Lady Cathedral, Bang Nok Kwaek, Samut Songkhram อาสนวิหารแม่พระบังเกิด บางนกแขวก สมุทรสงคราม

The Nativity of Our Lady Cathedral (Thai: อาสนวิหารแม่พระบังเกิด บางนกแขวก) is a religious building of the Catholic Church which is located in Bang Nok Khwaek, in the district of Bang Khonthi, province of Samut Songkhram in the central part of the Asian country of Thailand.

Its construction took six years and was built through the efforts of a French missionary in 1890, and for this reason its architecture is in the French Gothic style. It suffered some damage during World War II, but it was repaired shortly after. The cathedral was last renovated in 1994.

The cathedral follows the Roman or Latin rite and serves as the seat of the Diocese of Ratchaburi, which is a suffragan of the Archdiocese of Bangkok and was raised to its current status in 1965 by bull Qui in fastigio by Pope Paul VI.

It is under the pastoral responsibility of the Bishop John Bosco Panya Kritcharoen.

== Gallery ==
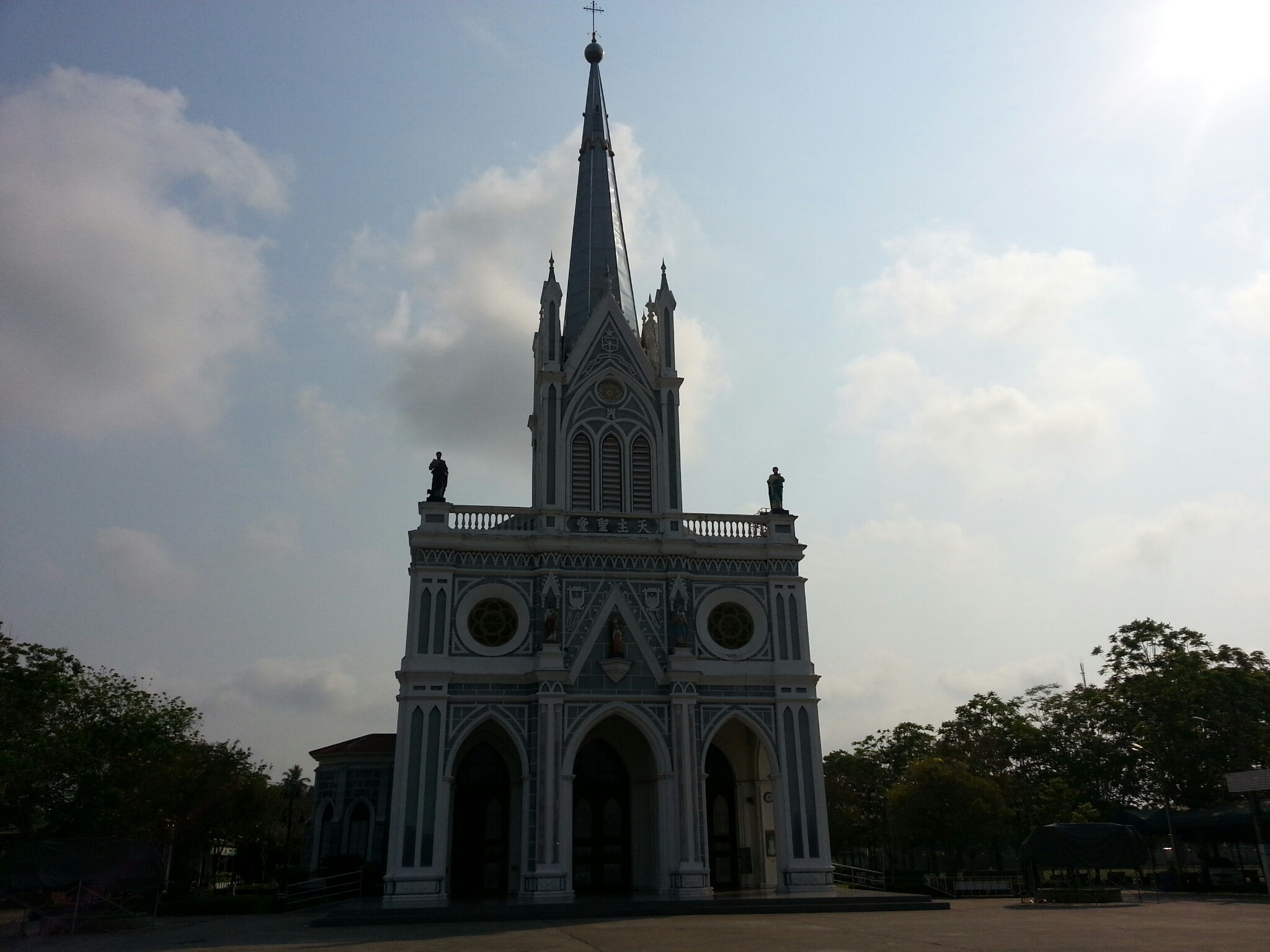

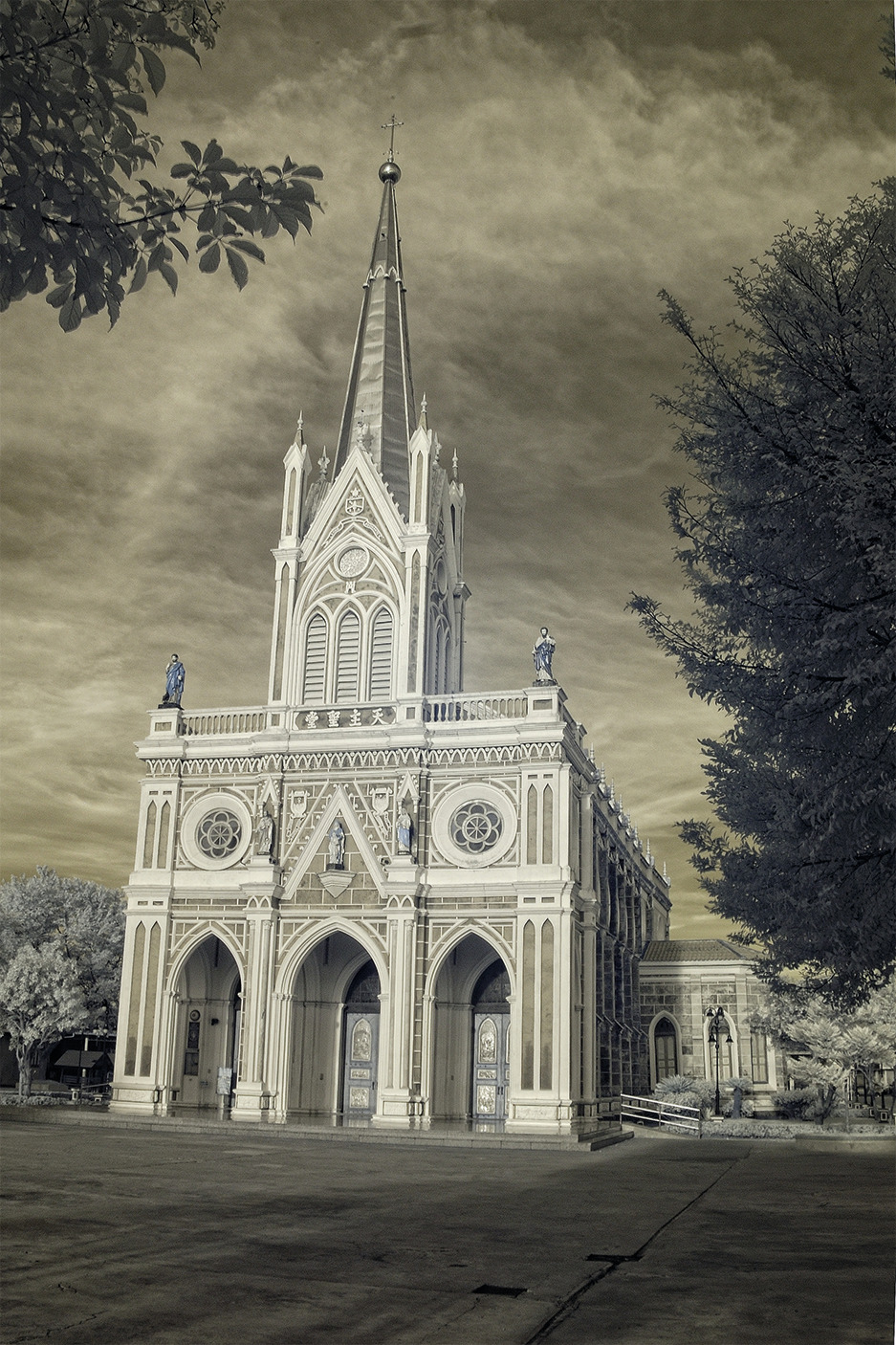

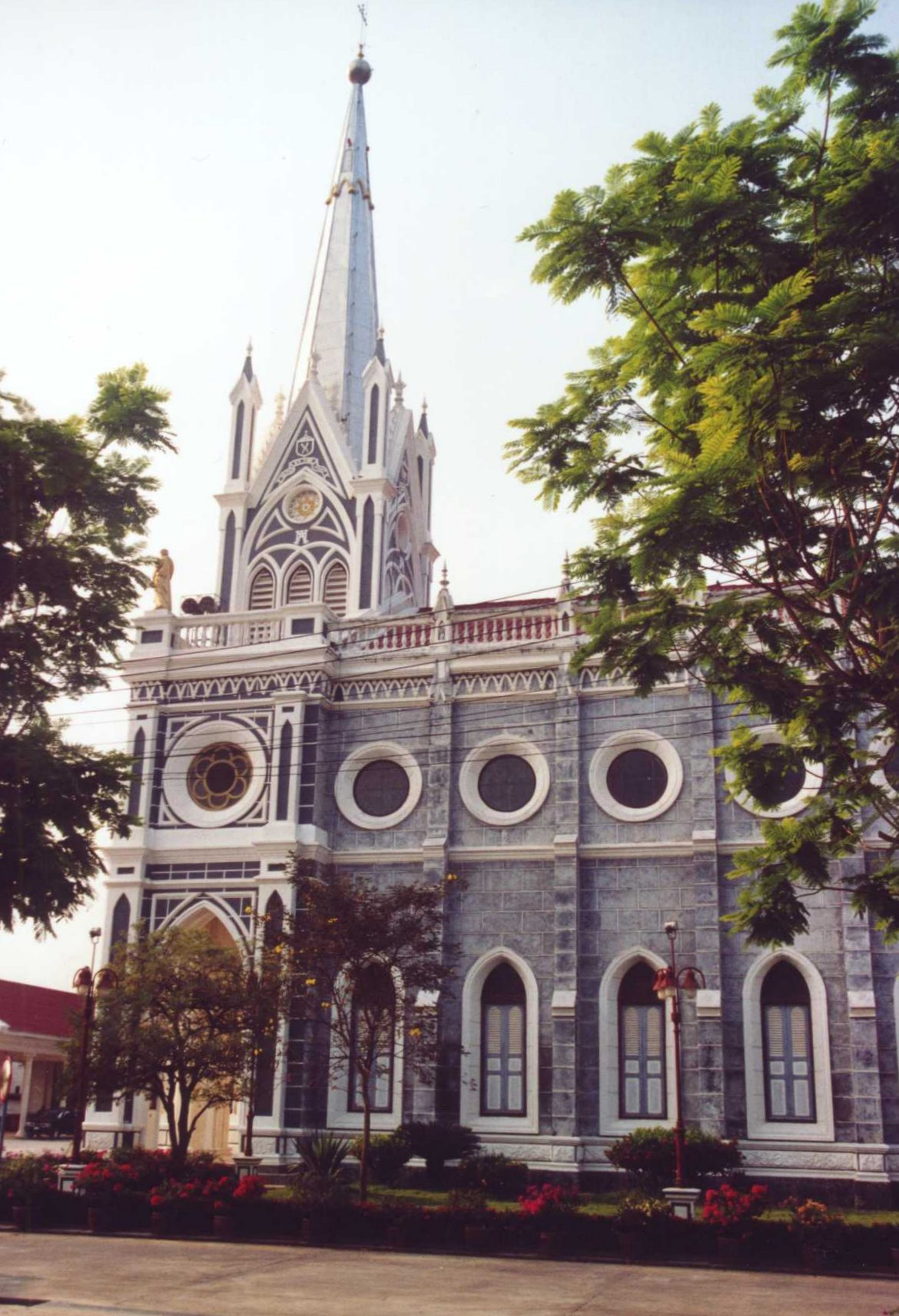

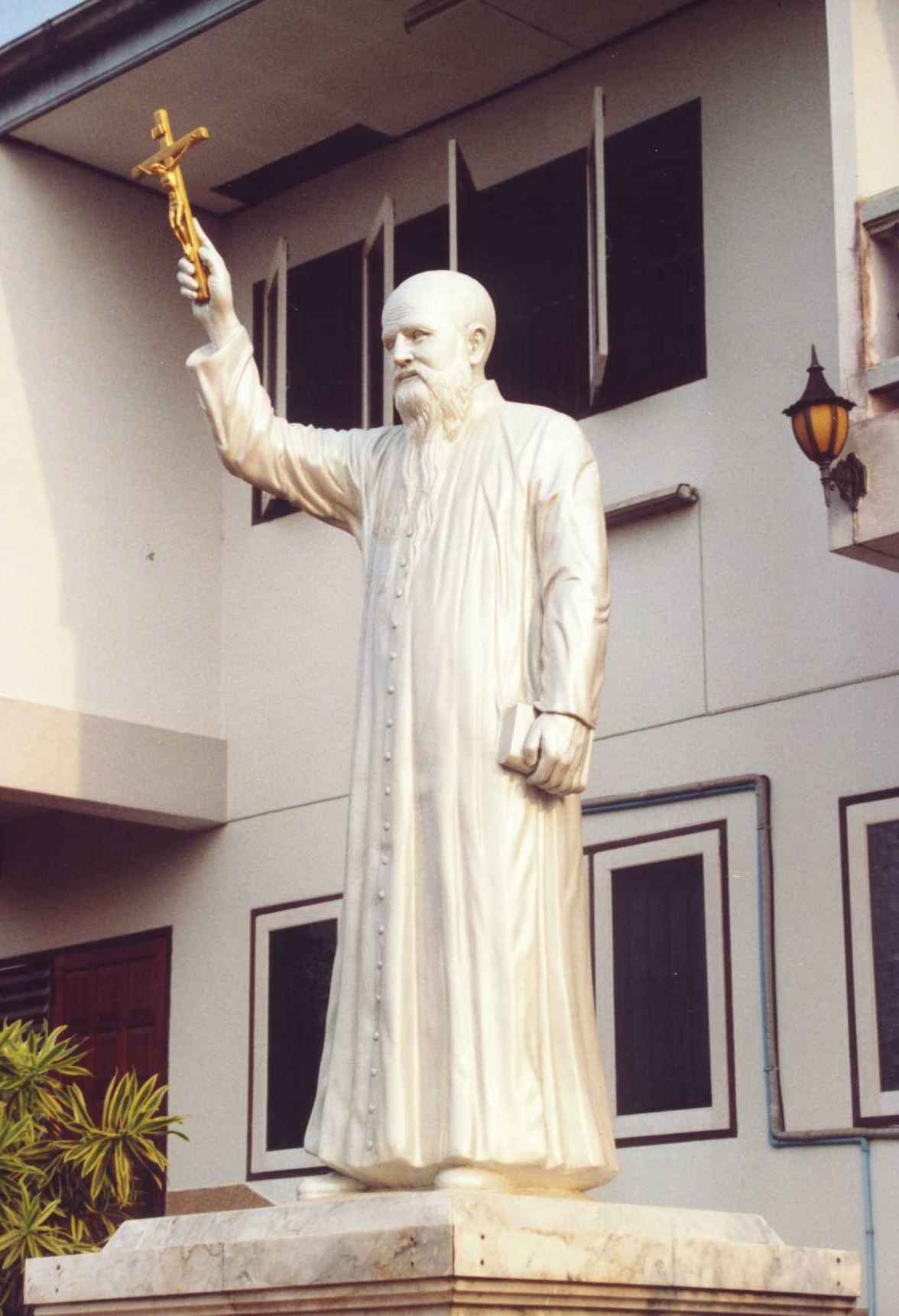

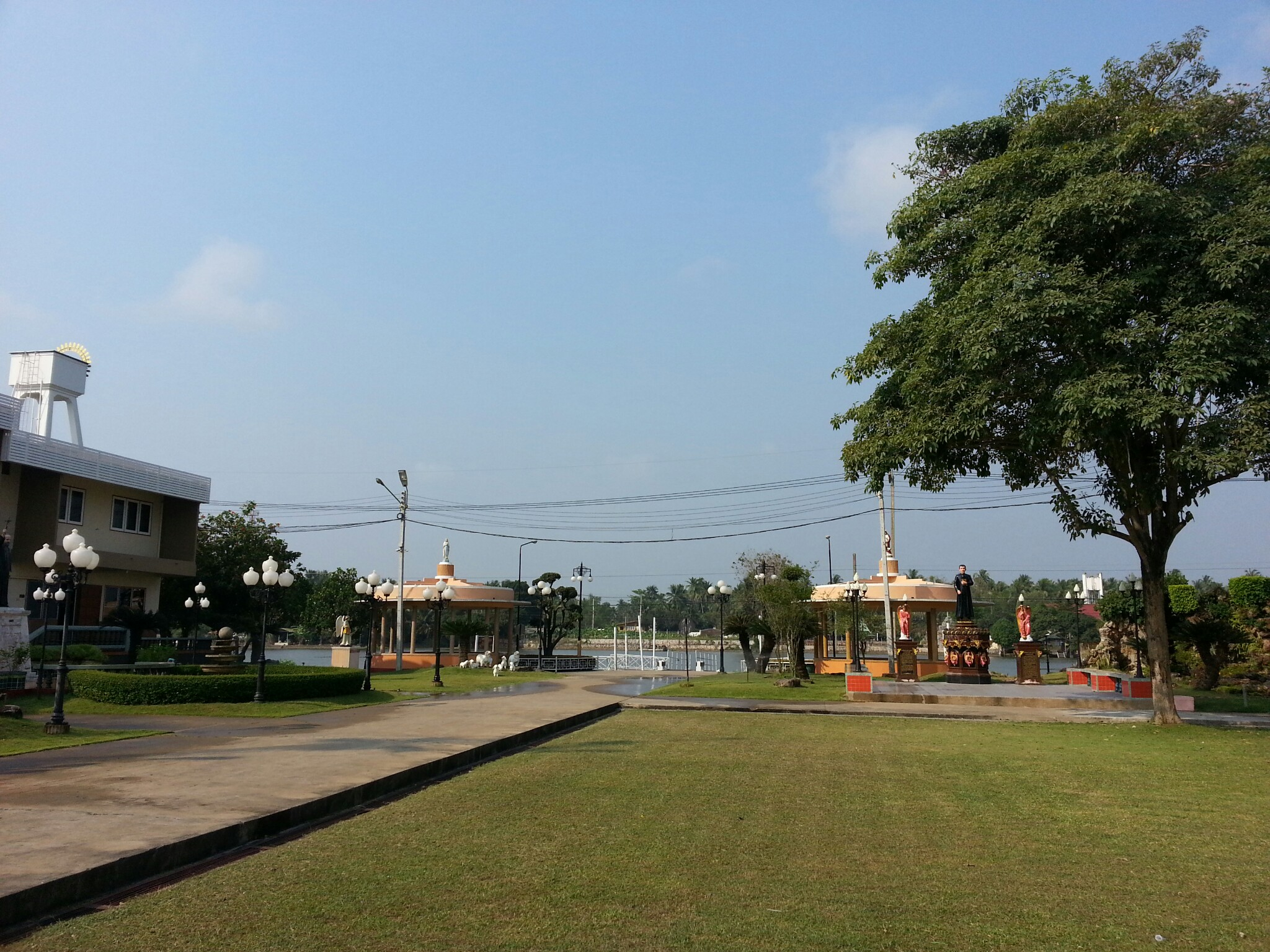
Park in Cathedral

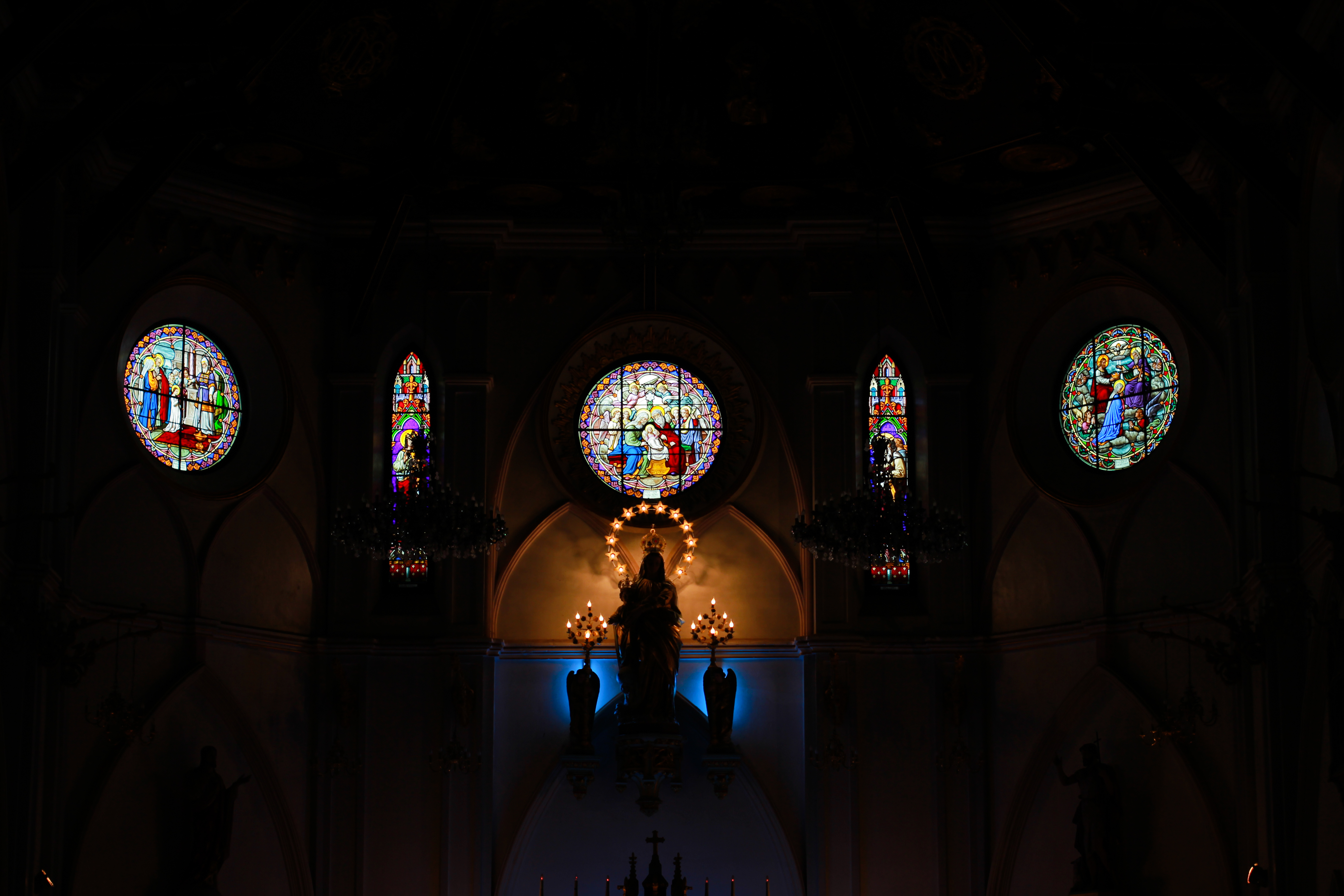
Internal View

== See also ==
- Roman Catholicism in Thailand
- Nativity of Our Lady
