= Pettah Market =

Open market in Colombo, Sri Lanka

Coordinates: 6.936260°N 79.849947°E

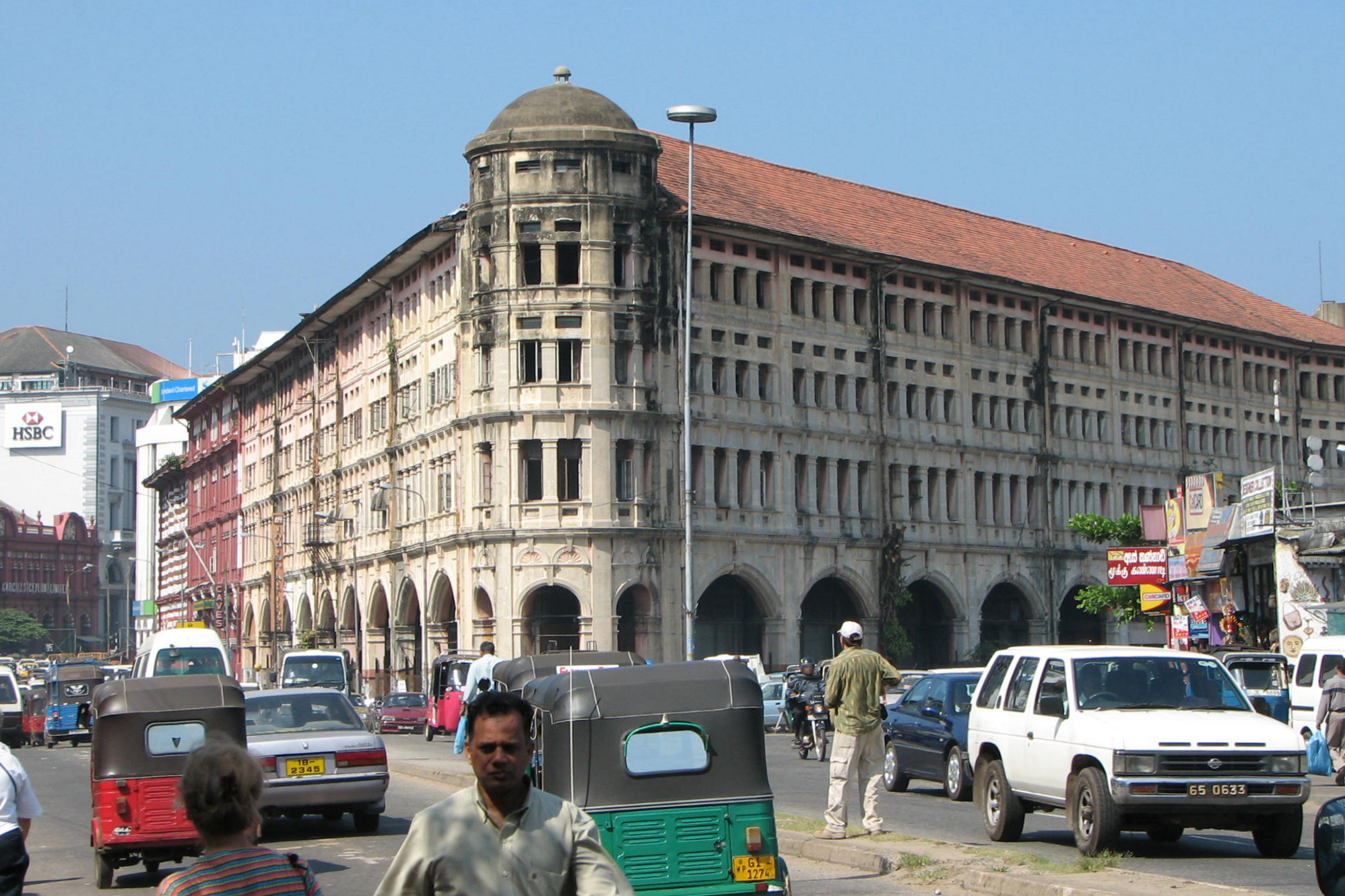
Main Street in Pettah with the Ghaffoor Building in the background

The Pettah Market also called Manning Market is an open market in the suburb of Pettah in the city of Colombo, Sri Lanka.

The entrance to the Pettah Market is marked formally by a tall monument in the centre of a roundabout, known as the Khan Clock Tower which was built by the family of Framjee Bhickajee Khan, an eminent Parsi family from Bombay who used to have substantial business interests in the country and who also owned the Colombo Oil Mills.

The Colombo Old Town Hall & Museum, which was built by the prominent Muslim Arasi Marikar Wapchie Marikar, is located at Kayman's Gate, so named because the Dutch used to stock crocodiles at Beira Lake to prevent their slaves from escaping. Today the building acts as a post office on the ground floor, and as a museum on the upper floor. Outside, there is an exhibit of old steam engines.

Most of the businesses in Pettah are dominated by Muslims who specialize in trading of goods and the Tamil people who have migrated from India traders who specialize in gold and jewelry shops. At the end of Pettah is sea street which is Sri Lanka's gold market where people from all around Sri Lanka come to purchase jewellery. It is a long street of jewellery shops with hundreds of shops next to one another. There are also some jewellery shops in main street Gaspa junction.

The most recognizable building in the Pettah Market is the candy-striped Jami Ul-Alfar Mosque (also known as The Red Mosque) which was built in 1909.
