= Pettah, Sri Lanka =

Pettah පිටකොටුව (Piṭakoṭuwa) புறக்கோட்டை (Puṟakkōṭṭai)
- Suburb
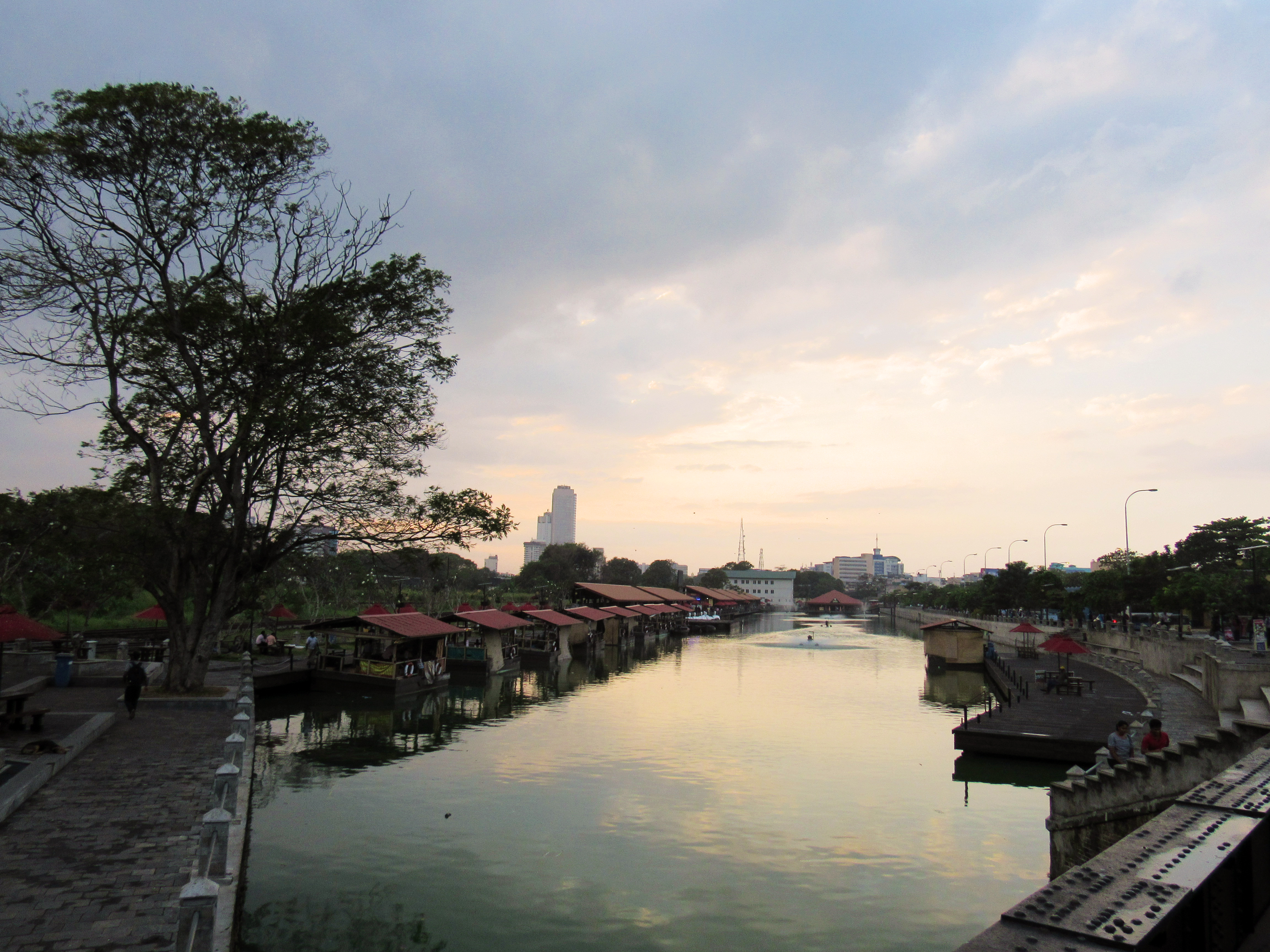
- Pettah Floating Market at dusk

- Location within Central Colombo Location within Colombo District Location within Sri Lanka
- Coordinates: 6°56′12″N 79°50′59″E
- Country: Sri Lanka
- Province: Western Province
- District: Colombo District 11
- Time zone: UTC+05:30 (Sri Lanka Standard Time Zone)
- Postal Code: 01100
- Website: pettah.lk

Pettah (Sinhala: පිටකොටුව (Piṭakoṭuwa), Tamil: புறக்கோட்டை (Puṟakkōṭṭai) is a neighbourhood in Colombo, Sri Lanka, located east of the city centre Fort, and behind the Colombo Port. The Pettah neighborhood is famous for the Pettah Market, a series of open air night pasars and markets. It is one of Sri Lanka's busiest commercial areas, where a huge number of wholesale and retail shops, buildings, commercial institutions and other organisations are located.

The main market segment is designed like a gigantic crossword puzzle, where one may traverse through the entire markets from dawn till dusk, but not completely cover every part of it.

Pettah is derived from Tamil: Pettai, an Anglo-Indian word used to indicate a suburb outside a fort. Today, the Sinhala phrase, pita-kotuwa (outside the fort) conveniently describes the same place.

== Demographics ==
Pettah is a multi-religious and multi-ethnic area. Moors, Bohras and Memons are the predominant ethnic group found within Pettah, however an average number of Sinhalese and Tamil populations also exist. There are also various other minorities, such as Burghers, Malays and others. Religions include Buddhism, Hinduism, Islam, Christianity and various other religions and beliefs to a lesser extent.

== Buildings and landmarks ==
Notable landmarks in the neighborhood include:

- Wolvendaal Church
- Jami Ul-Alfar Mosque
- Kayman's Gate
- Former Colombo Town Hall
- Colombo Dutch Museum
- Sammangodu Sri Kathirvelayutha Swami Kovil
- Old Town Hall Market
- Federation of Self Employees Market
- Manning Market
- Pettah Floating Market
- Cross Street Bazaars
- Central Bus Station
- Khan Clock Tower
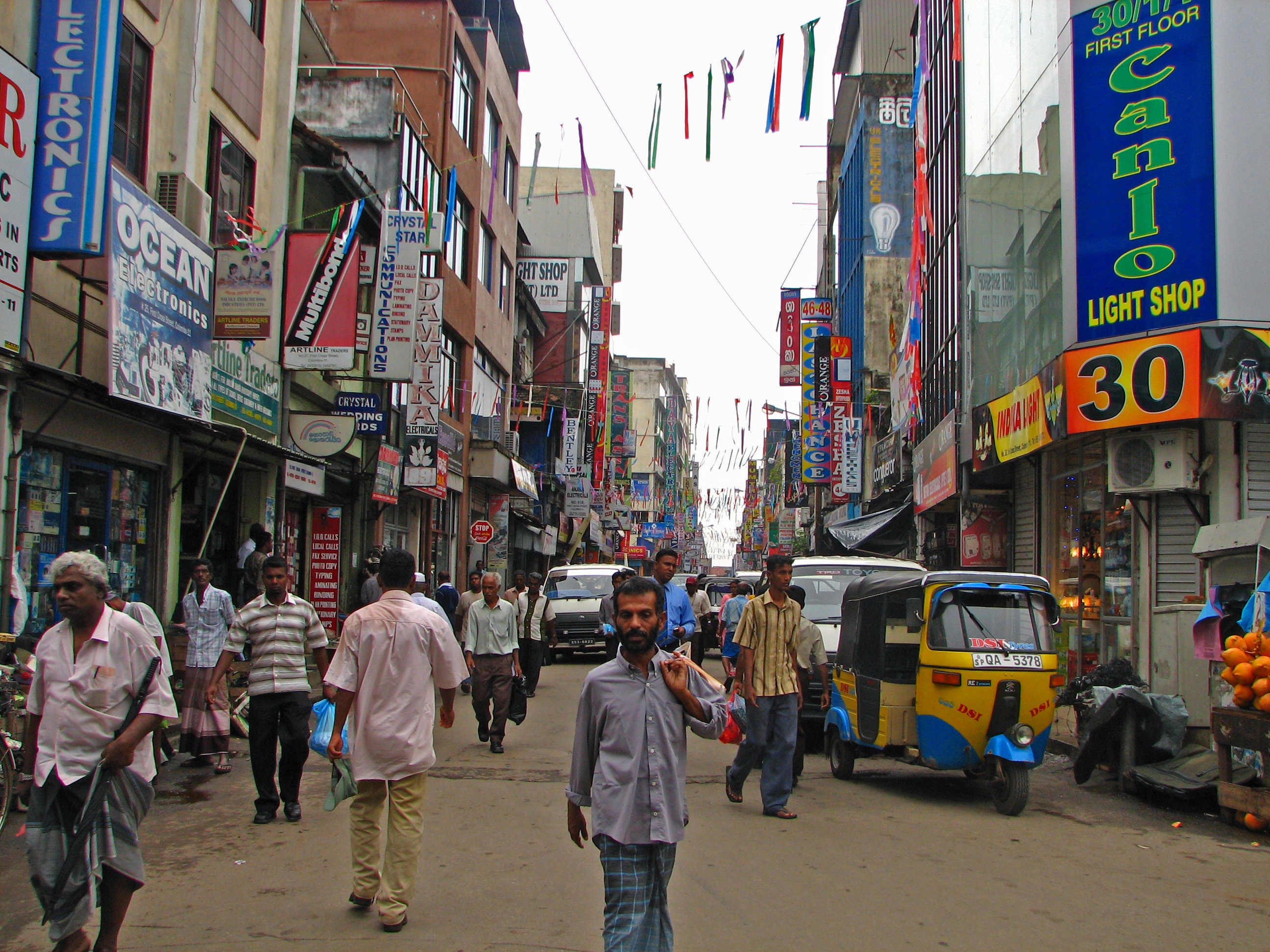
One of the streets that make up the Pettah Market.

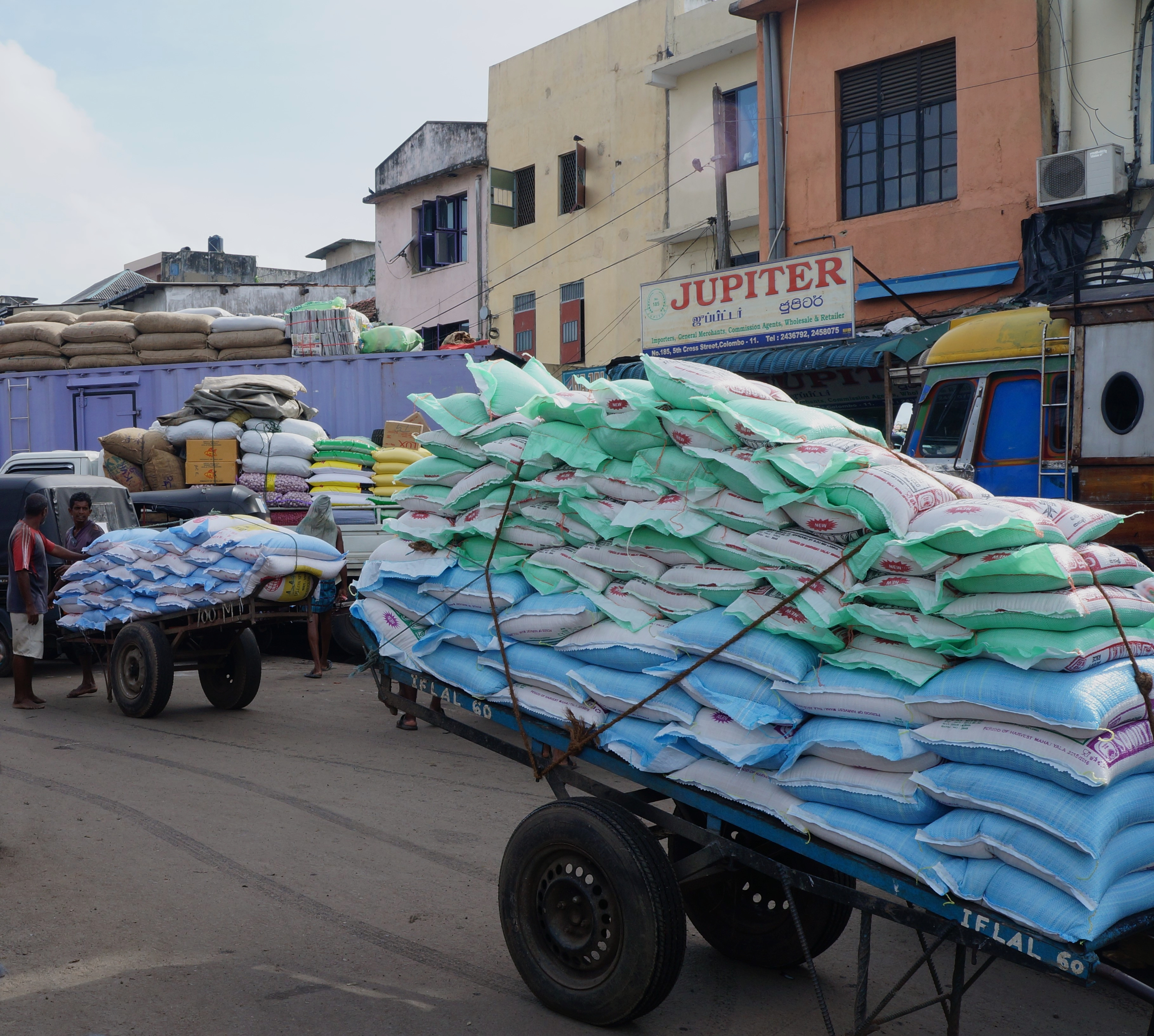
One of the streets that make up the Pettah Market

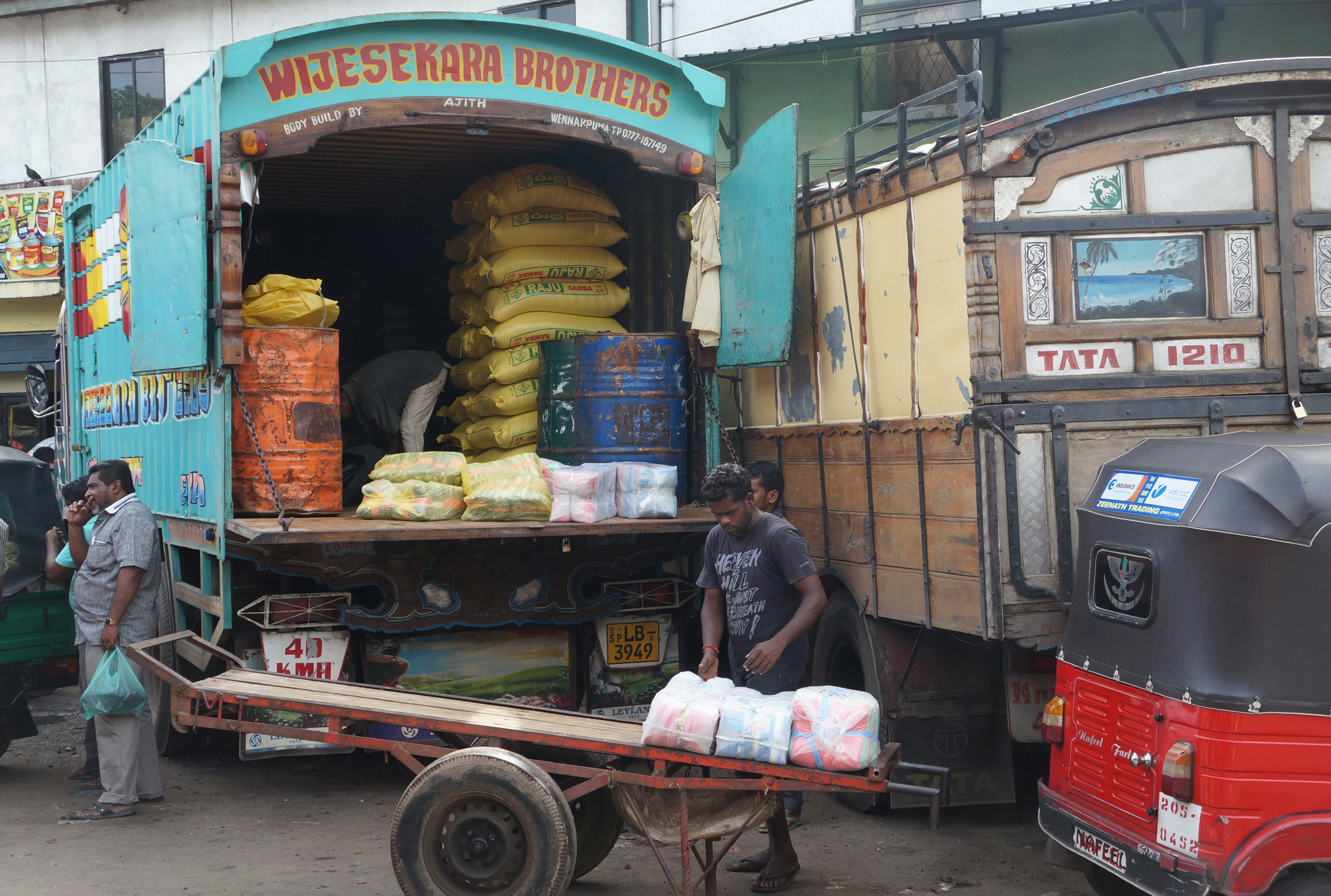
One of the streets that make up the Pettah Market
