= Khlong Hae Floating Market =

Coordinates: 7°02′49.6″N 100°28′26.7″E

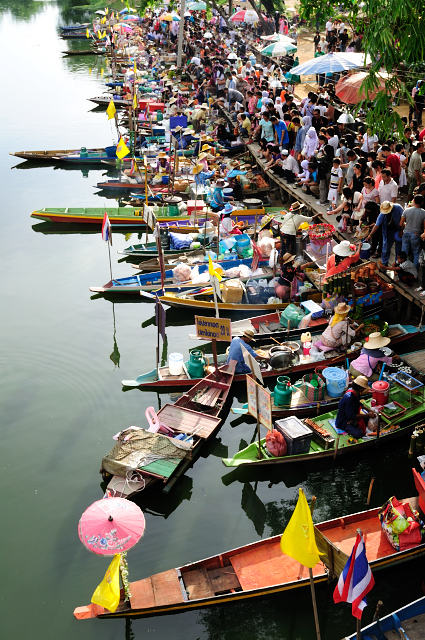
Typical atmosphere of Khlong Hae Floating Market

Khlong Hae Floating Market (Thai: ตลาดน้ำคลองแห, pronounced [tā.làːt náːm kʰlɔ̄ːŋ hɛ̌ː]) is a floating market in Thailand regarded as the first and only floating market in the southern Thailand. It is located in Tambon Khlong Hae, Amphoe Hat Yai, Songkhla Province opposite Wat Khlong Hae.

The traders here will dress in Thai retro costumes and there are many food choices including local food, Thai food and Muslim food. Another unique thing of this market is using eco-friendly food containers such as coconut shell, bamboo tube, and earthen pot rather than using foam or plastic containers. This floating market is considered unique from different markets in other regions of Thailand, as there are many cultures, Buddhist Thais and Muslims.

The market operates on Friday to Sunday including public holidays at 01.00 pm until about 09.00 pm. Most visitors are foreigners such as Indonesians, Malaysians, Singaporeans than Thais.
