= Pettah Floating Market =

Market in Colombo, Sri Lanka

Coordinates: 6°55′58″N 79°51′20″E

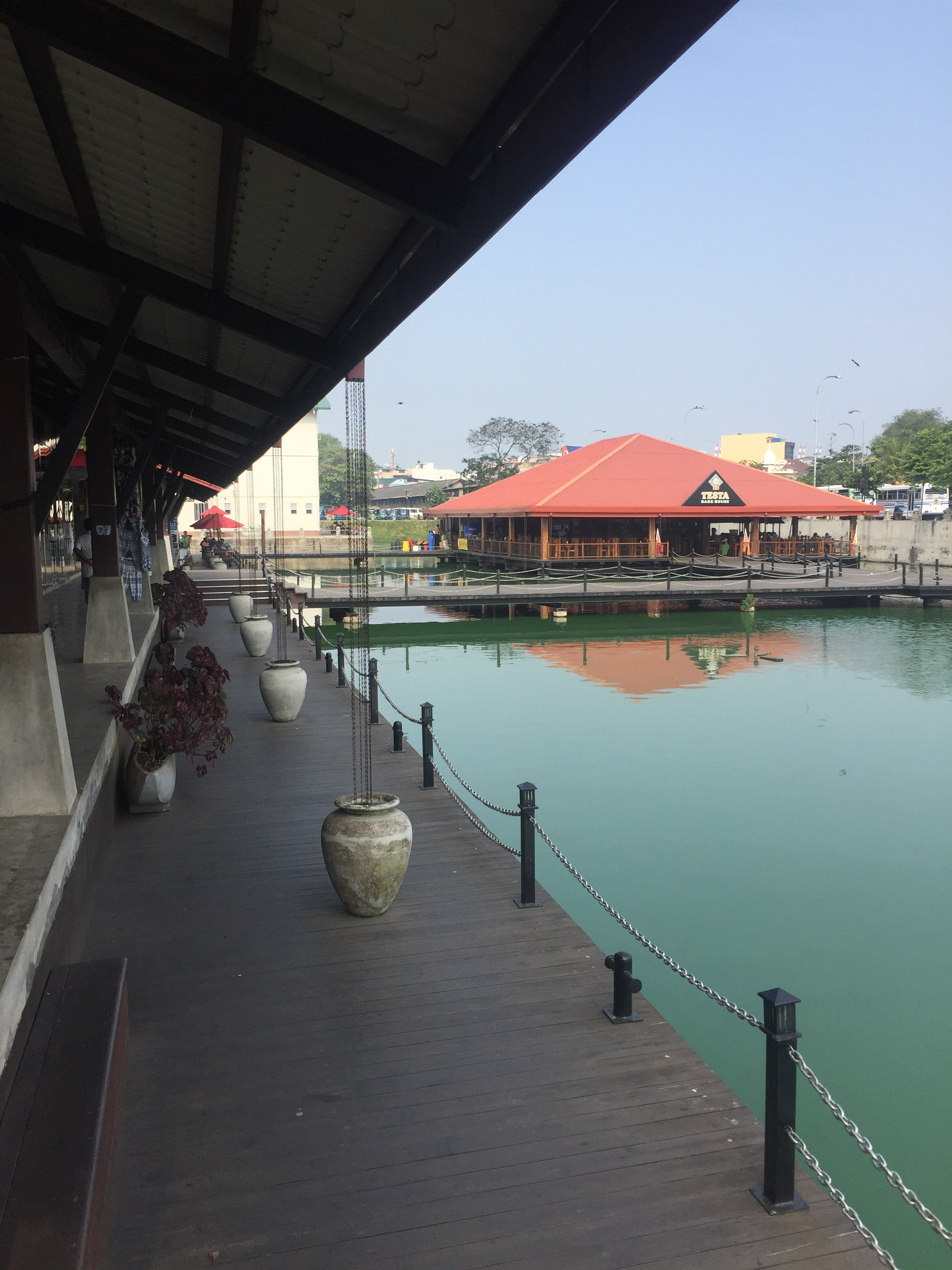
Pettah Floating Market

The Pettah Floating Markets are located on Bastian Mawatha in Pettah, a neighborhood in Colombo, Sri Lanka, and consist of 92 trade stalls, with a number of the stalls established on boats on Beira Lake. The floating market serves as a tourist attraction selling local produce and local handicraft.

The development of the floating market and beautification works were carried out by the Urban Development Authority (UDA) at a cost of Rs. 150 million. Engineering units from the Sri Lanka Army in collaboration with the Urban Development Authority transformed Bastian Street, the street linking the Central Bus Stand in Pettah and the Colombo Fort railway station, into a green environment. The Sri Lanka Navy rehabilitated the polluted canal running alongside Bastian Street. The unique simple architecture of the stalls along the canal, designed by Thushari Kariyawasam, with grey cemented floors and minimalistic décor, tries to reflect the calm and undisturbed water of lake.

The markets were officially opened by the Minister of Health, Maithripala Sirisena, on 25 August 2014.

One of the objectives of the development was to relocate unlicensed street vendors off the footpaths, particularly in congested areas like the Pettah, where they had no facilities and were forcing pedestrians onto the road. Priority was given to those traders who were impacted by the redevelopment on Bastian Street. Businesses however have struggled at the floating markets due to high rents and low sales. Traders have also criticised the open nature of the stalls and boats, which restrict their ability to secure their goods overnight. The UDA has advised that it will be undertaking promotional campaigns and improving accessibility to the area in an attempt to improve visitations to the area.
