= Ayothaya Floating Market =

Market in Ayutthaya province, Thailand

Coordinates: 14°21′37.5516″N 100°35′35.0196″E

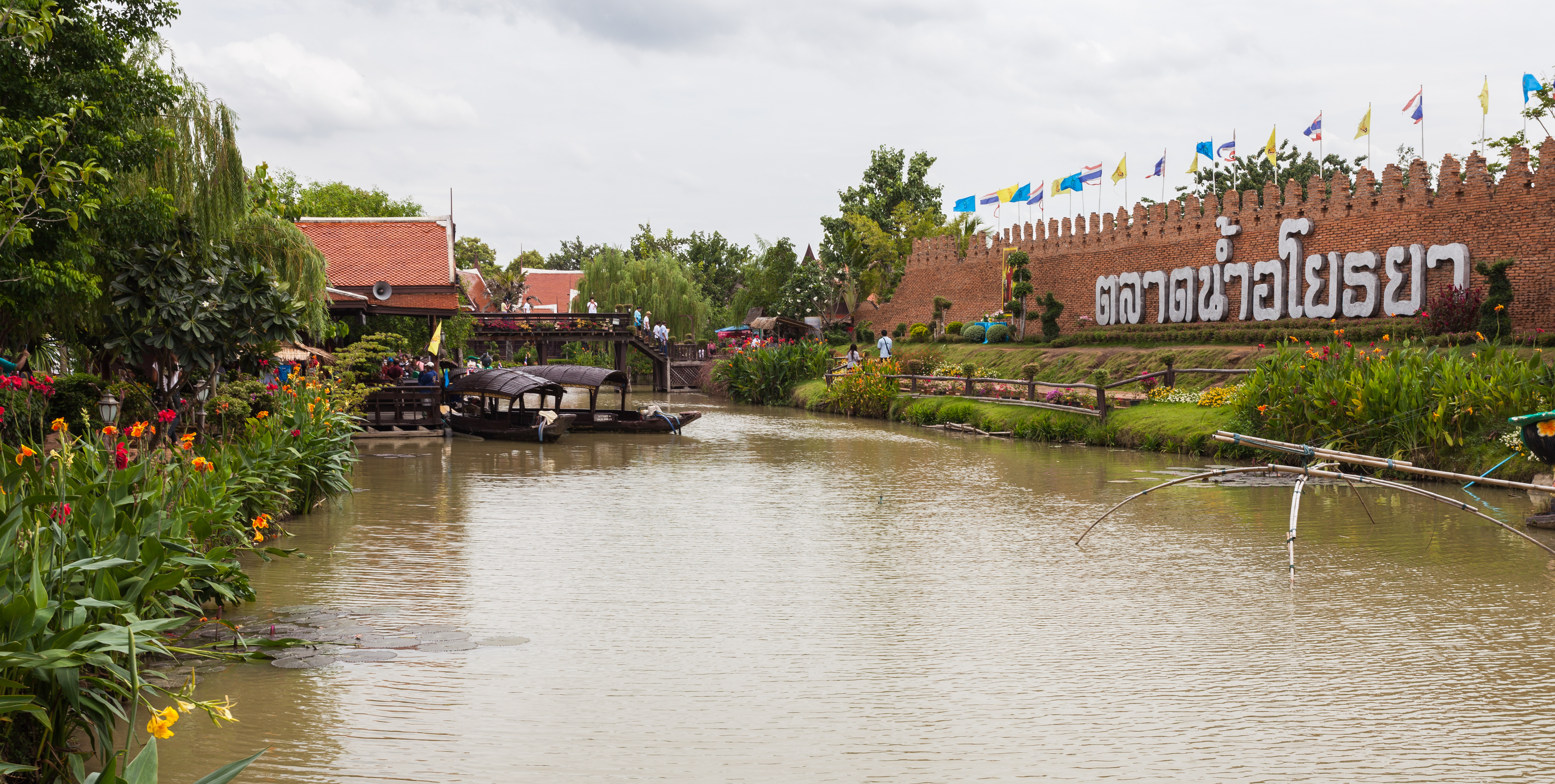
Entrance of the market

Ayothaya Floating Market (Thai: ตลาดน้ำอโยธยา, pronounced [tā.làːt náːm ʔā.jōː.tʰā.jāː]) is a cultural and shopping destination in Phra Nakhon Si Ayutthaya Province, central Thailand. It is less than 2 hours from Bangkok by car and train. The market has operated since May 2, 2010.

Ayothaya Floating Market is located at 65/12, Mu 7, Ayothaya, Tambon Phai Ling, Amphoe Phra Nakhon Si Ayutthaya, which is close to Ayutthaya Railway Station and Wat Maheyong.

This market is an artificial floating market unlike other markets including Damnoen Saduak or Amphawa Floating Market.

== Activities ==
The floating market has traditional Thai wooden houses lined along waterways and female vendors who dress in traditional Thai clothes, performing the history of the Ayutthaya War four times per day on weekends and public holidays. It has an area of about 80 rai (31 acres) divided into zones, which are named after the amphoes (districts) and renowned markets of Phra Nakhon Si Ayutthaya.

== Area ==
Goods include a variety of Thai food, as well as sweets, souvenir t-shirts, home decorations, and traditional Thai toys. Visitors can take a boat around the market or ride an elephant to visit the nearby Ayutthaya Historical Park.

The market is open daily from 9:00 am until 6:00 pm.
