= Kayman's Gate =

Entrance to the former Colombo Fort

Coordinates: 6.938574°N 79.853171°E

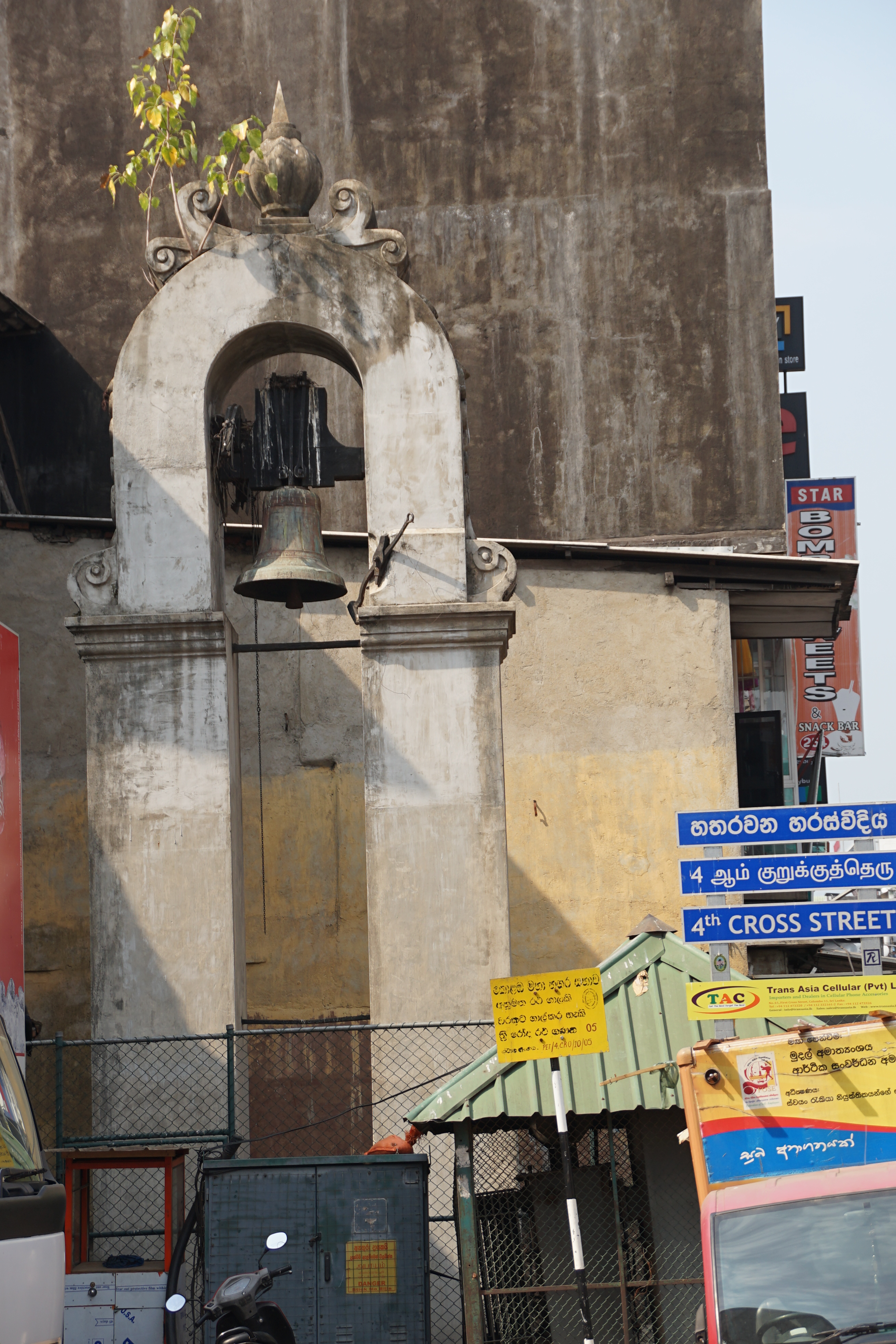
Kayman's Gate, at the intersection of Main and 4th Cross Streets, Colombo, Sri Lanka

Kayman's Gate (Sinhala: කයිමන් දොරකඩ, Kaiman Dorakada) was an entrance to the former Colombo Fort located at the foot of the Wolvendaal Hill in the Pettah district of Colombo, Sri Lanka. A historic free-standing bell tower still stands at the site, now at the intersection of Main and 4th Cross Streets.

== History ==
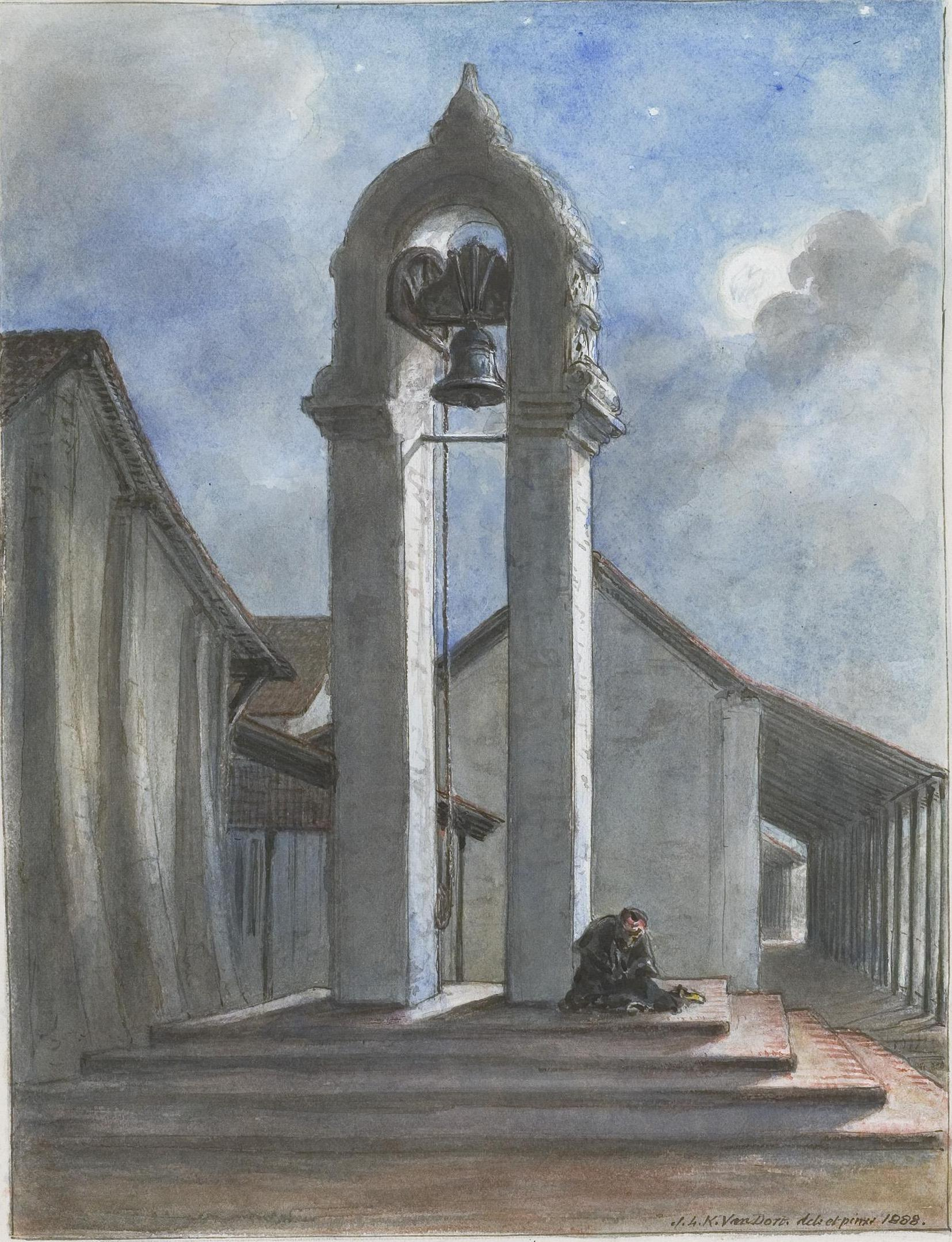
Watercolour of Kayman's Gate by J. L. K. van Dort (1888)

The second Colombo Fort was constructed by the Portuguese in 1554 as a fortification of their trading post at Colombo, and captured by the Dutch in 1656. Under the Portuguese, the fort's principal entrance at the eastern rampart was Porta Reinha ("Queen's Gate"), a large tunnel guarded by a drawbridge and moat. "Kayman's Gate" comes from the Dutch word kaaiman, crocodile. During that period, mugger crocodiles were found in large numbers in the Beira Lake, and would congregate in the moat to eat rubbish thrown out by the city dwellers within the fort. The south–north canal linking Beira Lake to the sea via the moat was later named St. John's River, and then, after being filled in during the British occupation, St John Street. Konings Straat (literally "King's Street"; originally the Portuguese Roa Directo, and now Main Street), linked the old city of Pettah with the fort, and terminated at Kayman's Gate. By 1870, the fort and its structures were almost completely demolished. Until the late 19th century, colonial rulers used the site of Kayman's Gate for public hangings.

The Kayman's Gate bell purportedly dates back to the 16th century, where it originally hung in a Portuguese church dedicated to Saint Francis in the Royal City of Kotte. Although Kotte was abandoned in 1565, the Dutch later reoccupied it and found a bell amidst the ruins of the church. This bell was relocated to a newly constructed bell tower at Kayman's Gate, where it was used as a curfew bell ‘to mark the closing of the Castle’s gates and lights out’. Following the demolition of the fort's walls, the bell was used to summon the worshippers to prayer and praise at the Wolvendaal Church, with the bell tower becoming part of the church's property.

Kayman's Gate is referenced in the song Paru Palamen, written by Sunil Edirisinghe.
