= Khan Clock Tower =

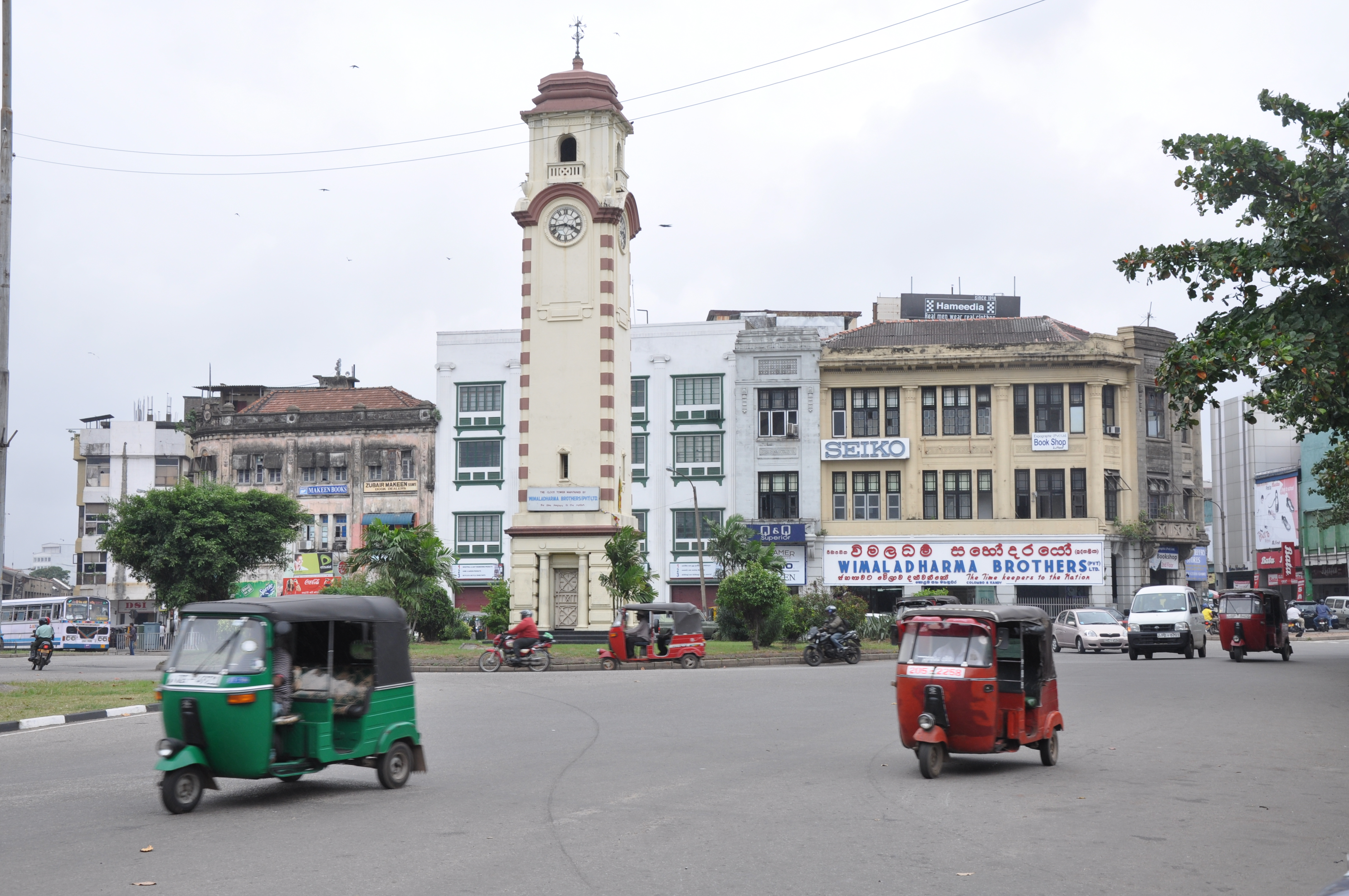
Khan Clock Tower

The Khan Clock Tower was built in Colombo, Sri Lanka by the Khan Family of Bombay. The Clock Tower is a popular landmark and marks the entrance to Pettah Market. The Clock Tower was built in the early 20th century by the family of Framjee Bhikhajee Khan. This Parsi family hailed from Bombay, India and also owned the famous Colombo Oil Mills as well as other business interests in Ceylon, as Sri Lanka was then called.

The clock tower also provided a working water fountain, but this no longer functions. The plate on the clock tower carries the inscription: "This clock tower and fountain was erected to the memory of Framjee Bhikhajee Khan by his sons Bhikhajee and Munchershaw Framjee Khan as a token of affectionate gratitude and dedicated through the Municipal Council to the citizens of Colombo on the fourth day of January 1923, the 45th anniversary of his death."

The tower is roughly four stories high and is situated on a landscaped roundabout that marks the entrance to the famous market.
