= Jami Ul-Alfar Mosque =

Mosque in Colombo, Sri Lanka and also known as the Red Mosque

Jami Ul-Alfar Mosque කොලඹ කොටුව රතු පල්ලිය கொழும்பு புறக்கோட்டை சம்மாங்கோடு பள்ளிவாசல் (மஸ்ஜிதுல் ஜாமிஉல் அஃபார்)
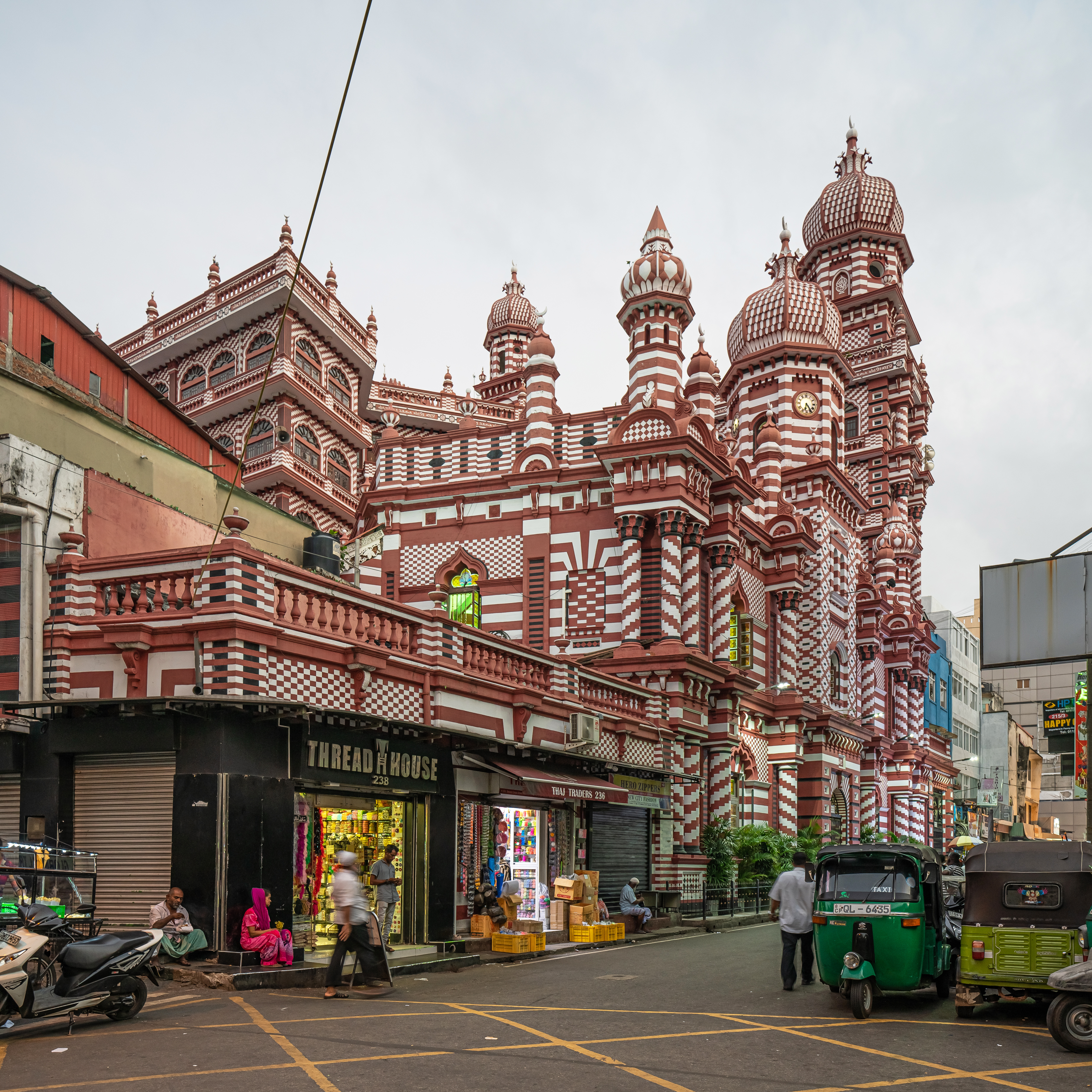
- The distinctive red and white minarets of Jami Ul-Afar

- Location within Central Colombo

Religion
- Affiliation: Islam

Location
- Location: Pettah, Colombo, Sri Lanka
- Coordinates: 6.9385°N 79.8518°E

Architecture
- Type: mosque
- Style: Indo-Saracenic
- Groundbreaking: 1908
- Completed: 1909

Website
- redmasjid.com

Jami-Ul-Alfar Mosque (Sinhala: කොලඹ කොටුව රතු පල්ලිය, romanized: Kolomba Kotuwa Rathu Palliya, Tamil: மஸ்ஜிதுல் ஜாமிஉல் அஃபார் அல்லது சம்மாங்கோடு பள்ளிவாசல், romanized: Sammankodu Pallivasal, (known colloquially as the Samman Kottu Palli, Rathu Palliya, Red Masjid or the Red Mosque) is a historic mosque in Colombo, Sri Lanka. It is located on Second Cross Street in Pettah. It is one of the oldest mosques in Colombo and a popular tourist site in the city.

== History ==
Construction of the Jami-Ul-Alfar Mosque commenced in 1908 and the building was completed in 1909. The mosque was commissioned by the local Indian Muslim community, based in Pettah, to fulfill their required five-times-daily prayer and Jummah on Fridays. The mosque's designer and builder was Habibu Lebbe Saibu Lebbe (an unlettered architect), and was based on details/images of Indo-Saracenic structures provided by South Indian traders, who commissioned him. It is a hybrid style of architecture, that draws elements from native Indo-Islamic and Indian architecture, and combines it with the Gothic revival and Neo-classical styles. Originally it had the capacity for 1,500 worshippers although at the time only around 500 were attending prayers.

It is a distinctive red and white candy-striped two-storey building, with a clock tower, and is reminiscent of the Jamek Mosque in Kuala Lumpur, Malaysia (constructed in 1910). Before other landmarks were built, some claim that the Jami Ul-Alfar Mosque was recognised as the landmark of Colombo by sailors approaching the port.

In 1975 the mosque, with the assistance of the Haji Omar Trust, purchased a number of the adjoining properties and commenced building an expansion to the mosque to increase its capacity to 10,000 worshippers.

== See also ==
- Islam in Sri Lanka
