= Wat Phet Samut Worawihan =

Buddhist temple in Thailand

Coordinates: 13°24′33.12″N 99°59′55.32″E

- วัดเพชรสมุทรวรวิหาร
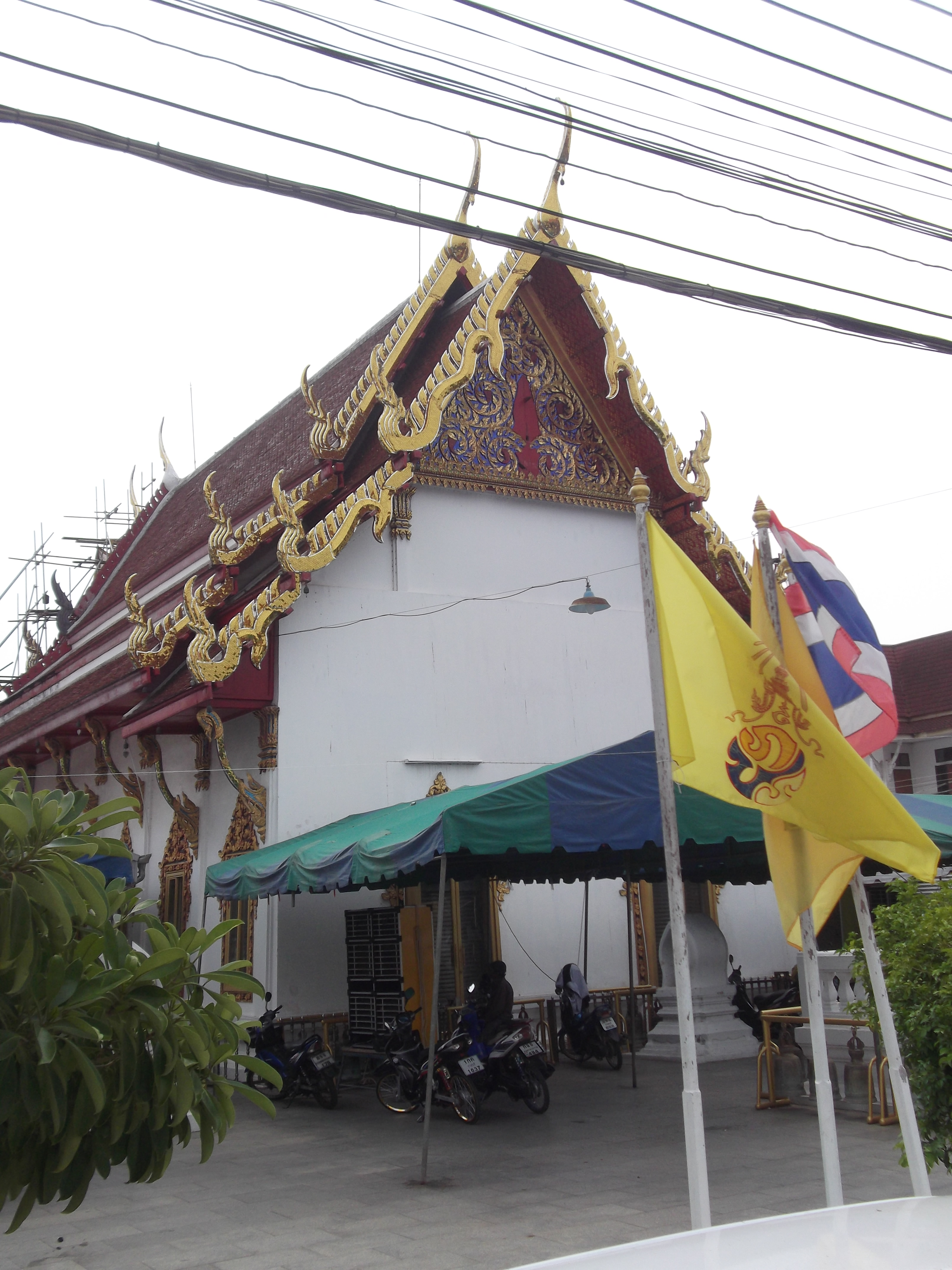
- Behind of ordination hall

- Location within Thailand

Religion
- Affiliation: Buddhism

Location
- Location: Phet Samut Rd, Mae Klong, Mueang Samut Songkhram, Samut Songkhram, Thailand
- Country: Thailand
- Interactive map of Wat Phet Samut Worawihan

Architecture
- Founder: Ban Laem villagers

Wat Phet Samut Worawihan (Thai: วัดเพชรสมุทรวรวิหาร) or popularly known as Wat Ban Laem (วัดบ้านแหลม) is an ancient Thai Buddhist temple in Mahā Nikāya sect of Samut Songkhram Province.

== History ==
Wat Phet Samut Worawihan considered as the third-class royal temple include provincial temple. It was built in the Ayutthaya period during the King Prasat Thong's reign under the name "Wat Si Champa" (วัดศรีจำปา).

According to royal chronicles, Ava troops attacked Phetchaburi in 1764, causing Ban Laem villagers from the area to flee here. They rebuild this temple and called its name according to their original settlements.

== Principal Buddha image ==
The principal Buddha image of the temple named "Luang Por Ban Laem" (หลวงพ่อบ้านแหลม), which is Buddha image carrying alms posture, approx 167 cm high (5 ft 5 in), presumably built in the Sukhothai–early Ayutthaya periods.

According to folklore, this Buddha image was found floating in the river, along with four other Buddha images, namely Luang Por Sothon (หลวงพ่อโสธร) of Wat Sothonwararam in Chachoengsao, Luang Por Wat Rai Khing (หลวงพ่อวัดไร่ขิง) of Wat Rai Khing in Nakhon Pathom, Luang Por To (หลวงพ่อโต) of Wat Bang Phli Yai Nai in Bang Phli, Samut Prakan and Luang Por Thong (หลวงพ่อทอง; also known as Luang Por Wat Khao Takrao–หลวงพ่อวัดเขาตะเครา) of Wat Khao Takrao in Ban Laem, Phetchaburi all of which are the principal Buddha images in the prominent temples of all central basin. Therefore, believed that all five were brothers. (some folklore tell that only three images were Luang Por Ban Laem, Luang Por Sothon, and Luang Por To).

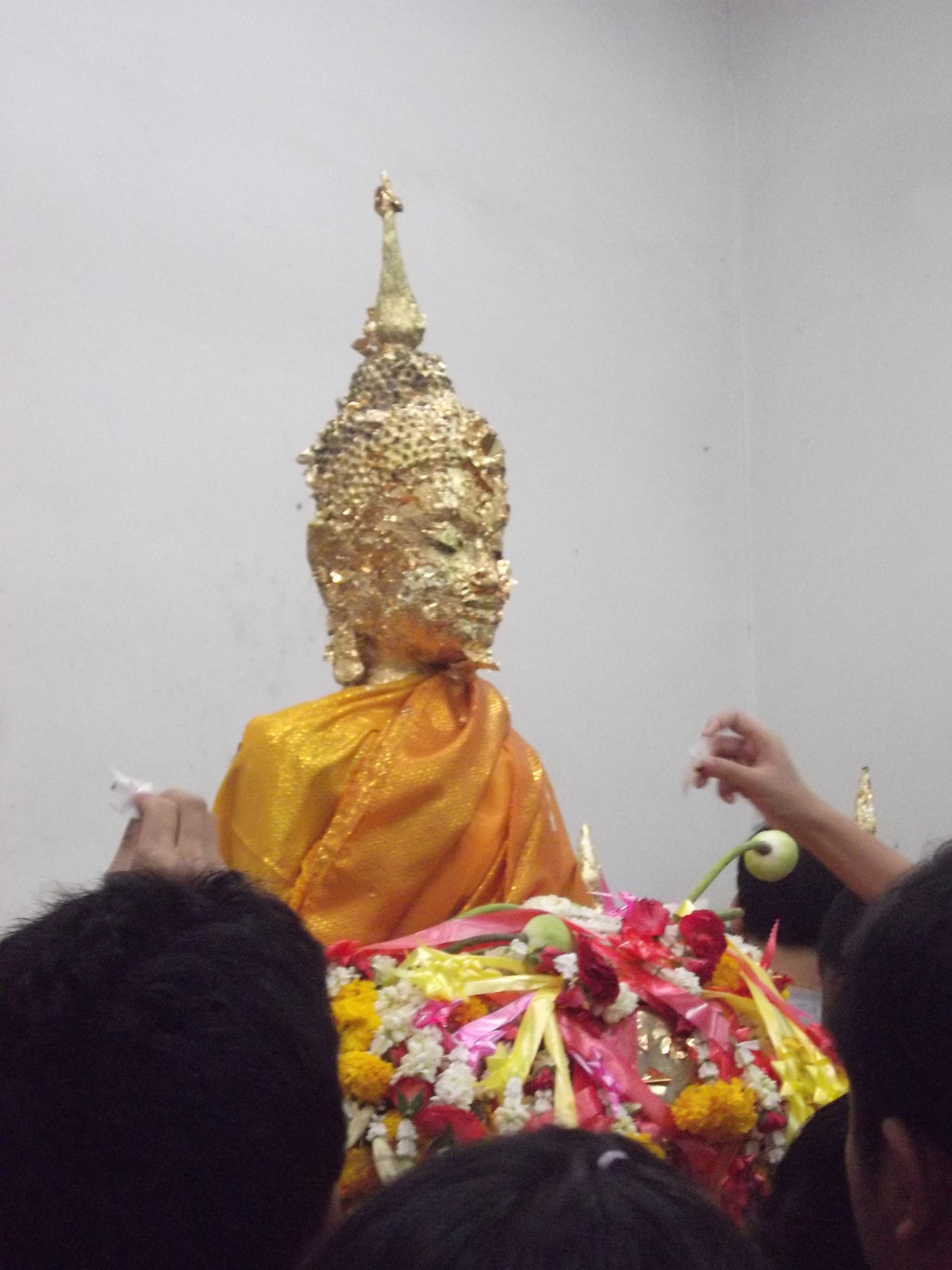
Luang Por Ban Laem

Luang Por Ban Laem is regarded as one of the most sacred Buddha images and is highly respected by Buddhists both domestics and outsiders. There are many people coming to pay homage and blessings especially vowing to recover from illness.

== Location ==
Wat Phet Samut Worawihan situated on Phet Samut Rd, Tambon Mae Klong, Amphoe Mueang Samut Songkhram, Samut Songkhram Province near Mae Klong River and Mae Klong Railway Station.

Presently, this temple is regarded as one of the most renowned tourist attractions of Samut Songkhram alike with Don Hoi Lot, Mae Klong Railway Market, and Amphawa Floating Market.

== Pop culture ==
Wat Phet Samut Worawihan or Wat Ban Laem include other places in Samut Songkhram are mentioned in the lyrics of least two luk thung (Thai country song), titles "Mon Rak Mae Klong" (มนต์รักแม่กลอง; literally: Mae Klong love spell) and "La Sao Mae Klong" (ลาสาวแม่กลอง; farewell Mae Klong girl). For La Sao Mae Klong describes a young seaman who must leave Mae Klong (Samut Songkhram) went to get service at Phra Chulachomklao Fort, Samut Prakan. It has been popular since 1966, with new recordings by many singers, but original version by Panom Nopporn.
