= Mueang Samut Songkhram district =

Mueang Samut Songkhram เมืองสมุทรสงคราม
- District
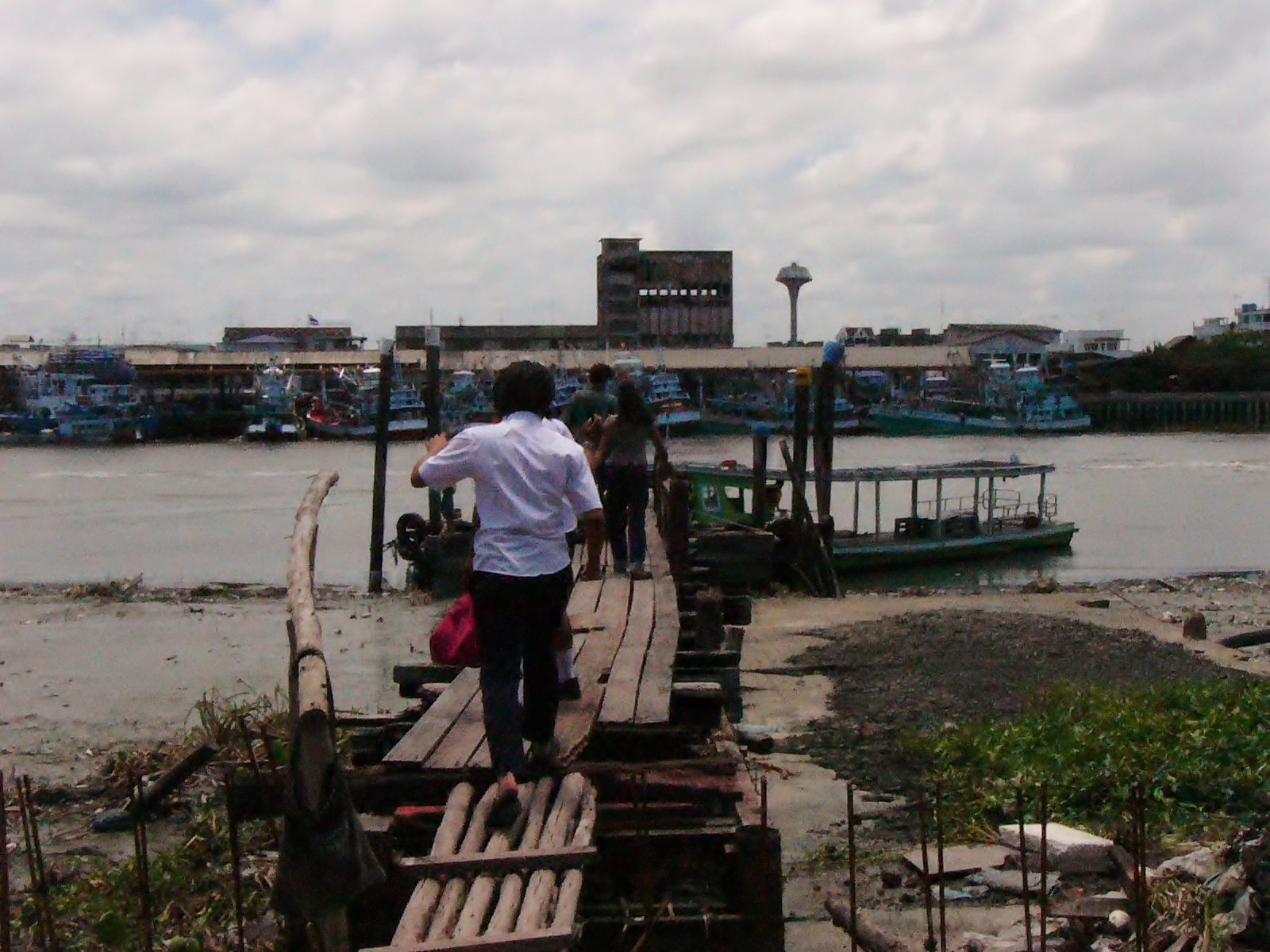
- Mae Klong ferry pier beside Wat Ban Laem. The Mae Klong bisects Samut Songkhram.

- District location in Samut Songkhram province
- Coordinates: 13°24′50″N 100°0′12″E
- Country: Thailand
- Province: Samut Songkhram
- Seat: Mae Klong

Area
  - Total: 169.0 km^{2} (65.3 sq mi)

Population (2023)
  - Total: 104,028
  - Density: 615/km^{2} (1,590/sq mi)
- Time zone: UTC+7 (ICT)
- Postal code: 75000
- Calling code: 034
- ISO 3166 code: TH-7501

Mueang Samut Songkhram (Thai: เมืองสมุทรสงคราม, pronounced [mɯ̄a̯ŋ sā.mùt sǒŋ.kʰrāːm]) is the capital district (amphoe mueang) of Samut Songkhram province, central Thailand.

== History ==
The district was established in 1897, then named Lom Thuan and controlled by Monthon Ratchaburi. In 1900 the district office was moved to a temple area in Ban Prok. The district was named accordingly in 1917. The office was moved again to Mae Klong camp, Mae Klong Subdistrict, and at the same time the name changed to Mae Klong in 1925. In accordance with governmental policy that the capital district name should be the same as the provincial name, Mae Klong district was renamed "Mueang Samut Songkhram" in 1938. Since 1964 the district office is in Tambon Mae Klong.

Thai local people still call Mueang Samut Songkhram by its old name Mae Klong.

== Geography ==
The district is on the shore of the Bay of Bangkok, at the mouth of the Mae Klong River.

Neighboring districts are (from the south clockwise) Ban Laem Phetchaburi province, Amphawa, and Bang Khonthi of Samut Songkhram, and Ban Phaeo and Mueang Samut Sakhon of Samut Sakhon province.

Off the coast are the sandbanks of Don Hoi Lot famous for its endemic shell population of Solen regularis. The site has been listed as a Ramsar wetland since 2001.

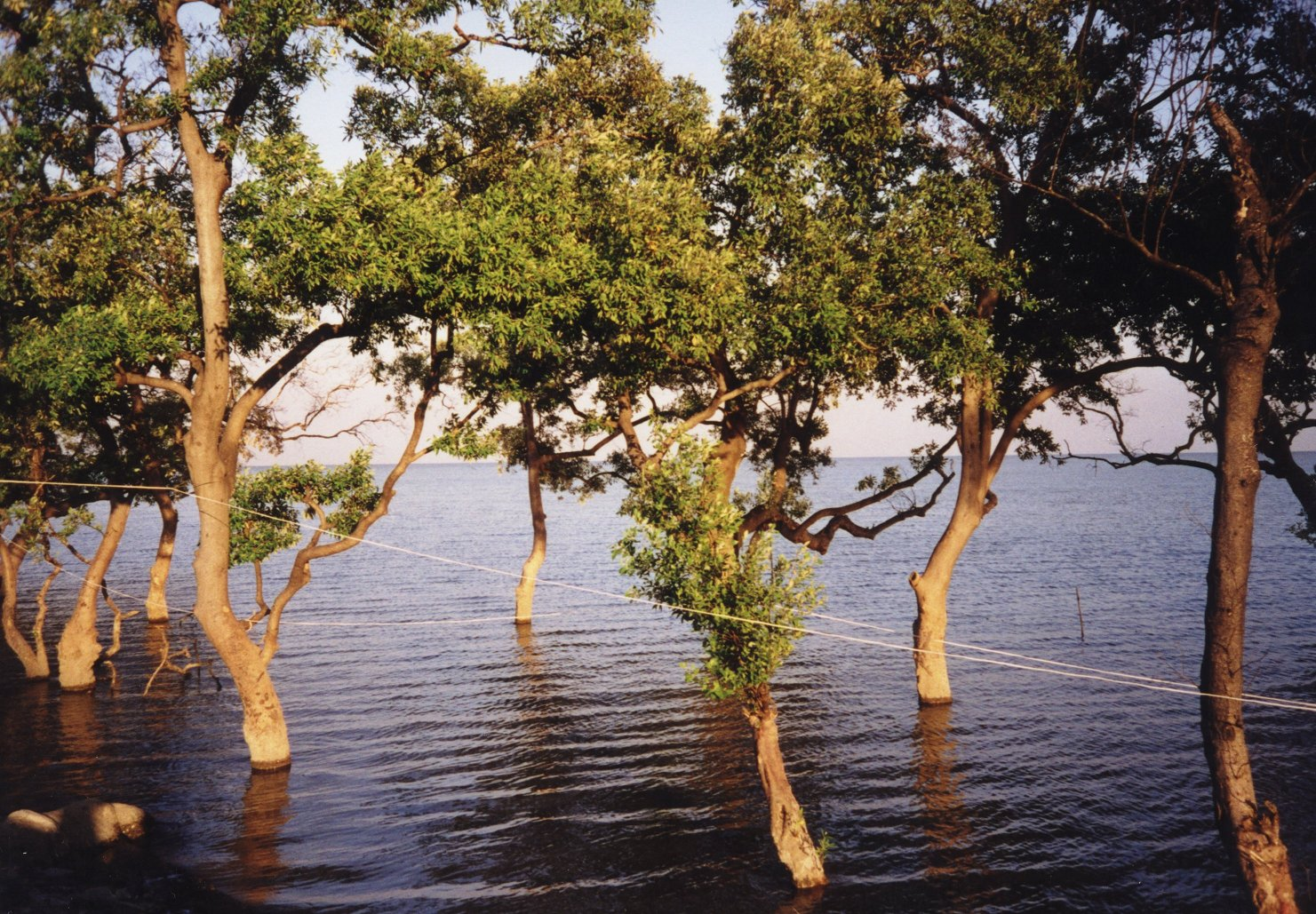
Don Hoi Lot during high tide

== Administration ==
=== Central government ===
The district is divided into 11 subdistricts (tambons), which are further subdivided into 87 villages (mubans).

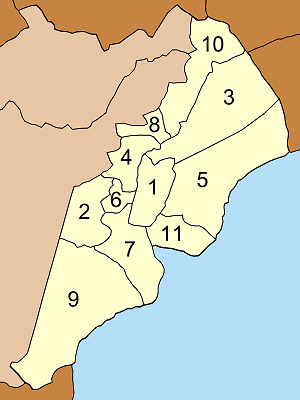
Map of subdistricts

No.	Subdistricts	Thai	Villages	Pop.
1.	Mae Klong	แม่กลอง	-	25,623
2.	Bang Khan Taek	บางขันแตก	12	8,593
3.	Lat Yai	ลาดใหญ่	12	18,602
4.	Ban Prok	บ้านปรก	11	8,635
5.	Bang Kaew	บางแก้ว	10	9,495
6.	Thai Hat	ท้ายหาด	6	5,158
7.	Laem Yai	แหลมใหญ่	8	7,645
8.	Khlong Khoen	คลองเขิน	9	5,452
9.	Khlong Khon	คลองโคน	7	4,296
10.	Nang Takhian	นางตะเคียน	7	6,143
11.	Bang Chakreng	บางจะเกร็ง	5	4,386
		Total	87	104,028

=== Local government ===
As of December 2023 there are: two municipalities (thesaban), of which Samut Songkhram itself has town status (thesaban mueang) and covers subdistrict Mae Klong and Bang Chakreng is a subdistrict municipality (thesaban tambon). There are further nine subdistrict administrative organizations - SAO (ongkan borihan suan tambon - o bo to).

Town municipality	Pop.	website
Mueang Samut Songkhram	25,623	smsk-city.go.th

Subdistrict municipality	Pop.	website
Bang Chakreng	4,389	

Subdistrict adm.org-SAO	Pop.	website
Lat Yai	18,602	ladyai.go.th
Bang Kaew	9,495	bangkaewsamutsongkhram.go.th
Ban Prok	8,635	banprok.go.th
Ban Khan Taek	8,593	bangkhunteak.go.th
Laem Yai	7,645	leamyai.go.th
Nang Takhian	6,143	nangthakean.go.th
Khlong Khoen	5,452	khlongkhoen.go.th
Thai Hat	5,158	thaihad.go.th
Khlong Khon	4,296	klongkone.go.th

== Healthcare ==
=== Hospital ===
There is general hospital in Samut Songkhram with 282 beds.

=== Health promoting hospitals ===
There are total nineteen health-promoting hospitals in the district, of which; one in Ban Prok and Thai Hat, two in Ban Khan Taek, Ban Kaew, Laem Yai, Khlong Khoen, Khlong Khon, Nang Takhian and Bang Chakreng, three in Lat Yai.

== Religion ==
There are forty-three Theravada Buddhist temples in the district.
One in Laem Yai, two in Bang Kaew, Thai Hat and Bang Chakreng, three in Nang Takhian, four in Khlong Khoen, five in Lat yai, six in Mae Klong, Ban Prok and Khlong Khon and ten in Bang Khan Taek.

== Economy ==
Some people are fishermen or work in the twelve fish and seafood processing factories:

- Three in Mae Klong subdistrict
- Two in Ban Khan Taek subdistrict
- Four in Bang Kaew subdistrict
- Three in Bang Chakreng subdistrict
