= Amphawa Floating Market =

Market in Thailand

Coordinates: 13.425779°N 99.955303°E

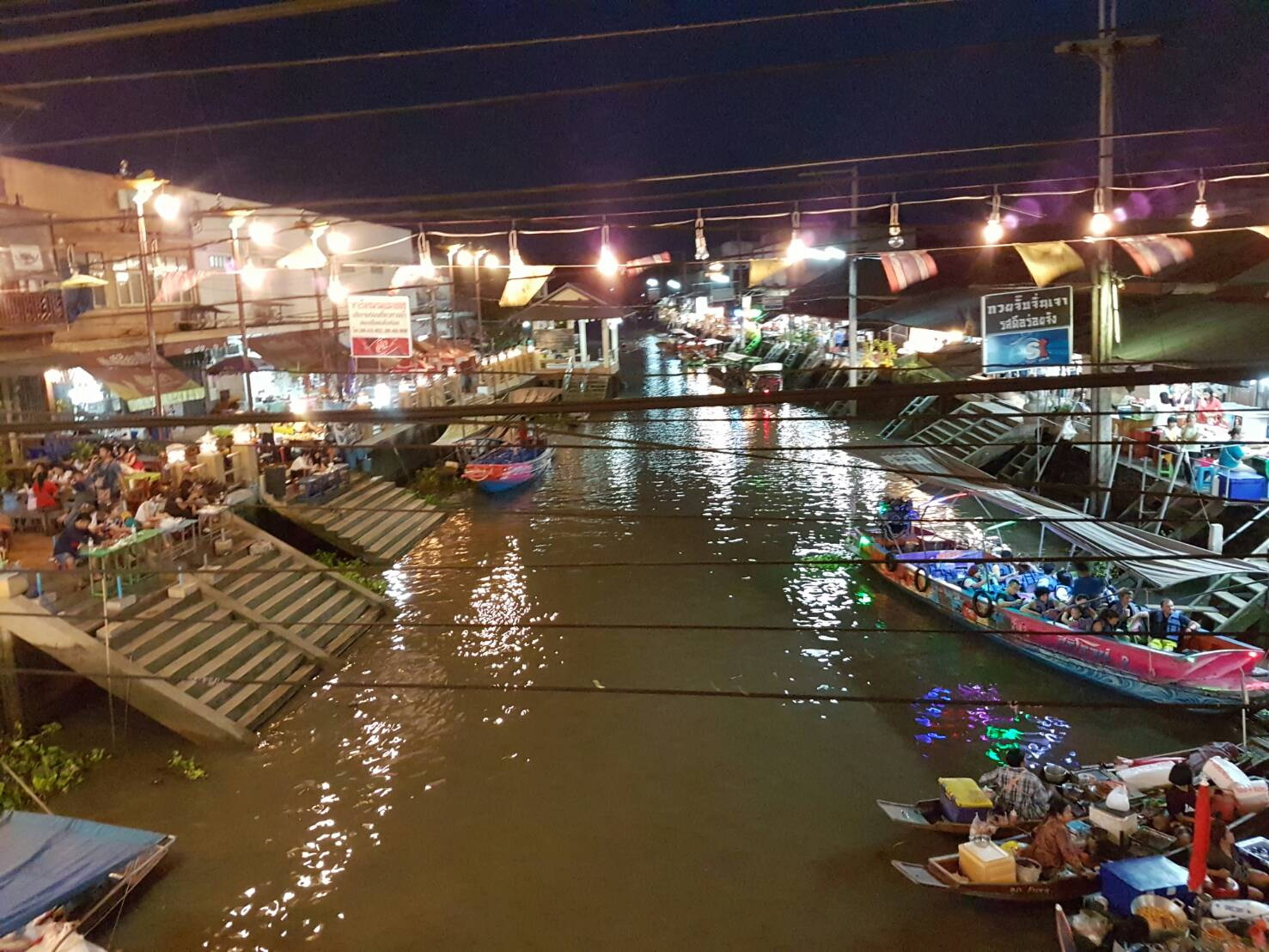
Amphawa Floating Market

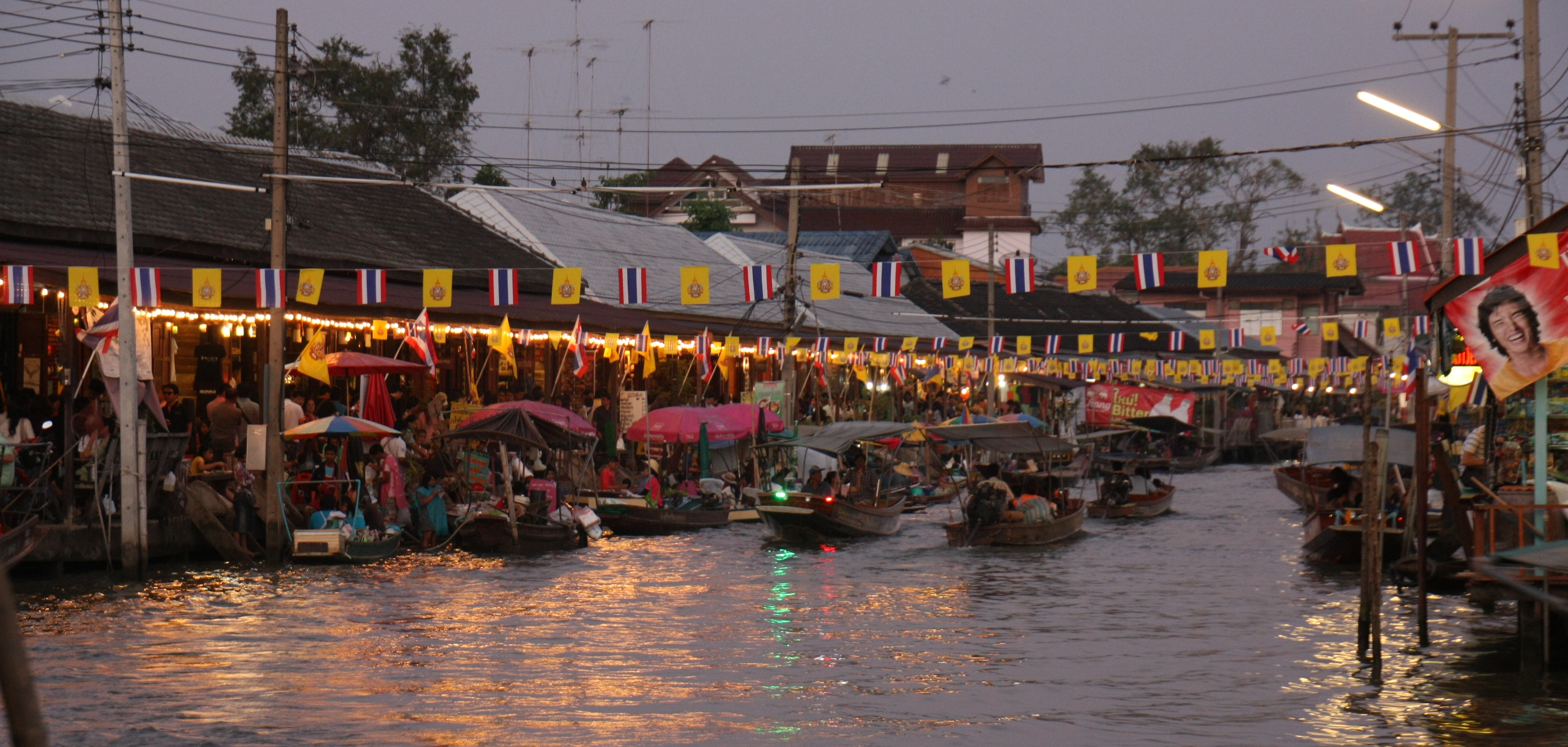
Ampha floating market, viewed from the Mae Klong river.

Amphawa Floating Market (Thai: ตลาดน้ำอัมพวา, RTGS: Talat Nam Amphawa, pronounced [tā.làːt náːm ʔām.pʰā.wāː]) is a floating market and a tourist attraction in the Amphawa District of Samut Songkhram Province, located in one of the branches of the Mae Klong river. Amphawa district is about 50 km away from Bangkok (less than one hour and a half travel time), making Amphawa floating market a popular tourist attraction in Thailand. The market is near “Wat Amphawa Chetiyaram” temple.

== History and view around the Amphawa Floating Market ==
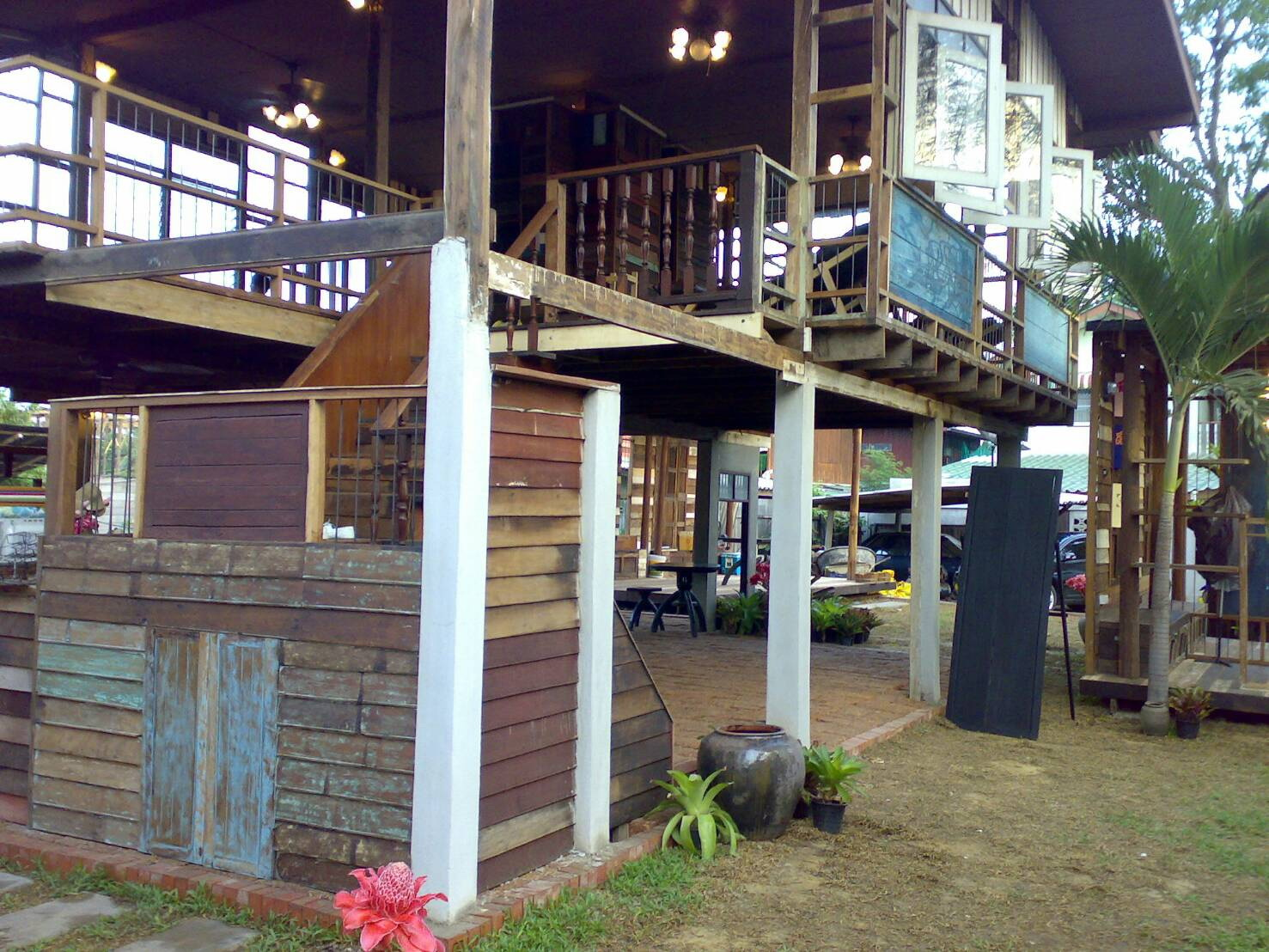
Old wood house

In the past, Amphawa was a small community that prospered in trade and agriculture. Amphawa floating market was used as the communication center of the Samut Songkhram province. A community of people lived by the river. Houses are located along the river to make it easier to transport by boat. People in early times traded on boats and earned a living.

The Amphawa floating market is very natural and there are many old wooden houses. Tourists will see the lifestyle of the locals and you will see the beauty of fireflies at night under the Lampoon trees. This makes people feel that they are going back to the old times.

In the Amphawa floating market, there are many shops such as souvenir stores, restaurants, ice-cream shops, and others. Most souvenir stores usually sell clothes. Tourists can buy many souvenirs in the Amphawa floating market.

== Activity ==
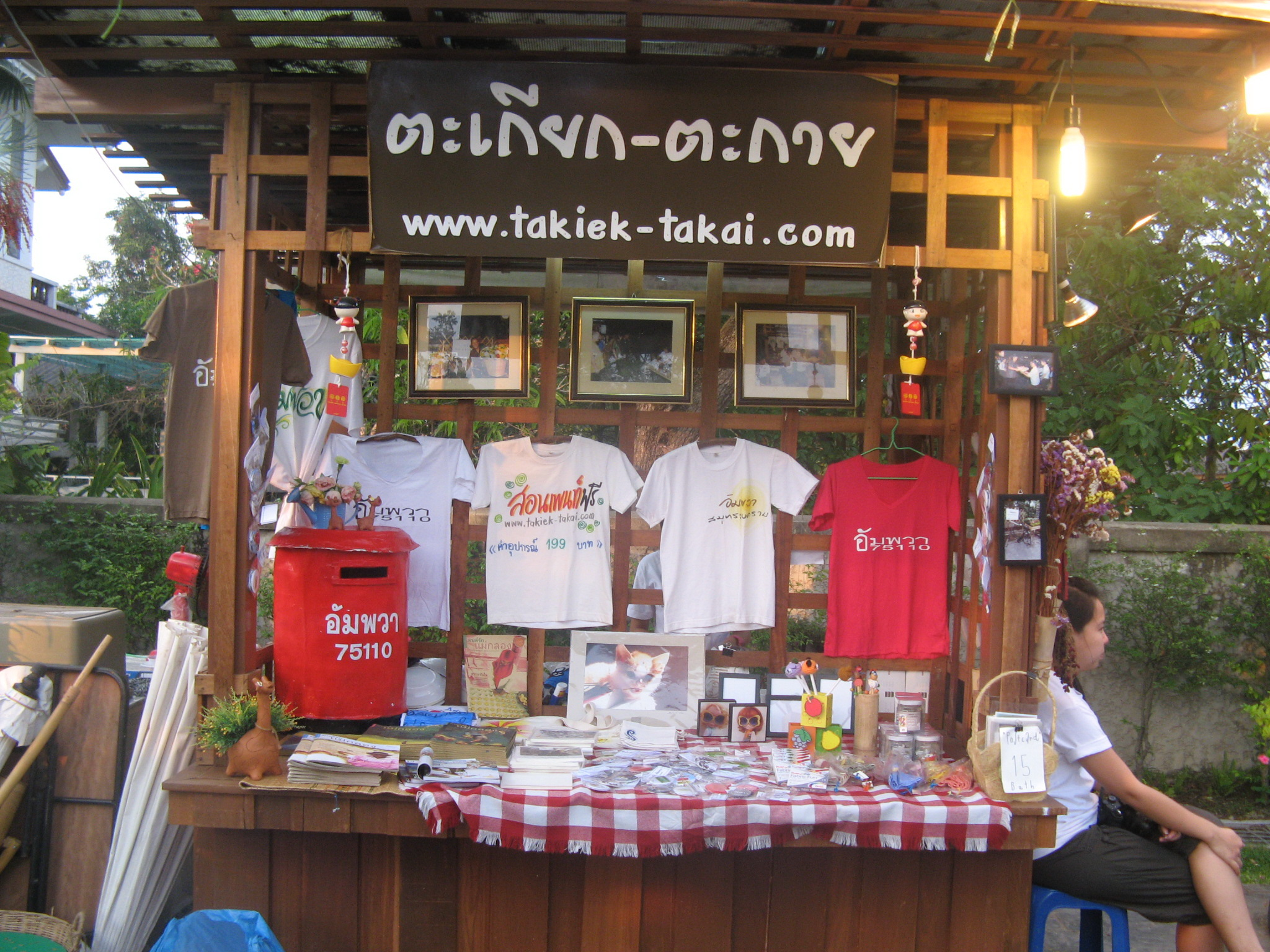
T-shirt Shop

=== Boat tour ===
Tourists can travel by boat to see views of the Mae Klong river. For travel with a private boat, it charges 500 baht or more but 50 baht for an individual. The trip takes around 1 hour and you will cruise along the river, by the temple, and the market at the river. The boats take you along the “Mae Klong” river to several old temples (known as temple to the Thai people).

=== Ride a bicycle ===
Bicycling around Amphawa is an activity for tourists. In the Amphawa Floating Market, the "Thai Tib” station has bicycle rentals and free maps for bicycle routes. Tourists will see the lifestyle of the locals. Biking routes with a distance of 10 km, with the label of the navigation “Thai Tib” station along the route. On the way, tourists can see the Thai dessert museum. Finally, tourists bike across the sling bridge to see the view in the evening at Amphawa floating market. Rates of bicycle for each person is free for first half-hours, the next half-hours is 30 baht, 2 hours is 120 baht, 3 hours is 150 baht, 4 hours is 180 baht, and for more than 5 hours is 250 baht.

=== Cruise watch fireflies ===
As for Nightlife in Amphawa, you can arrange for a boat trip along the “Mae Klong” to watch the fireflies. Watching fireflies on a cruise at night is what tourists enjoy when they come to stay at Samut Songkam. Usually, you can see fireflies during the rainy season. From May–October, tourists can see fireflies because it is easy to see them. Tourists who want to ride the boat to watch fireflies at night can lease according to port officials or lease the homestay in Amphawa. The cost of boat rides to watch the fireflies for each person is 60-80 baht, or if you lease a boat, the rate of boat costs 600 baht by 1–2 hours in.

=== Make merit ===
In the morning, visitors can give boats to monks at 6:00 am. Visitors can see the alms of the monks and tourists can also make merit. Visitors can make a donation to the Buddhist monks.

=== Shopping ===
The Amphawa floating market has many types of products, whether their Thai food, noodles, traditional coffee, juice, fruit, grilled seafood, and souvenirs. Highlight souvenirs include the Amphawa Floating Market T-shirts. All visitors can buy souvenirs for friends and family. Amphawa Floating Market T-shirts have many designs and styles. Each store will have a price that varies by model and pattern of the Shirt.

== Food ==
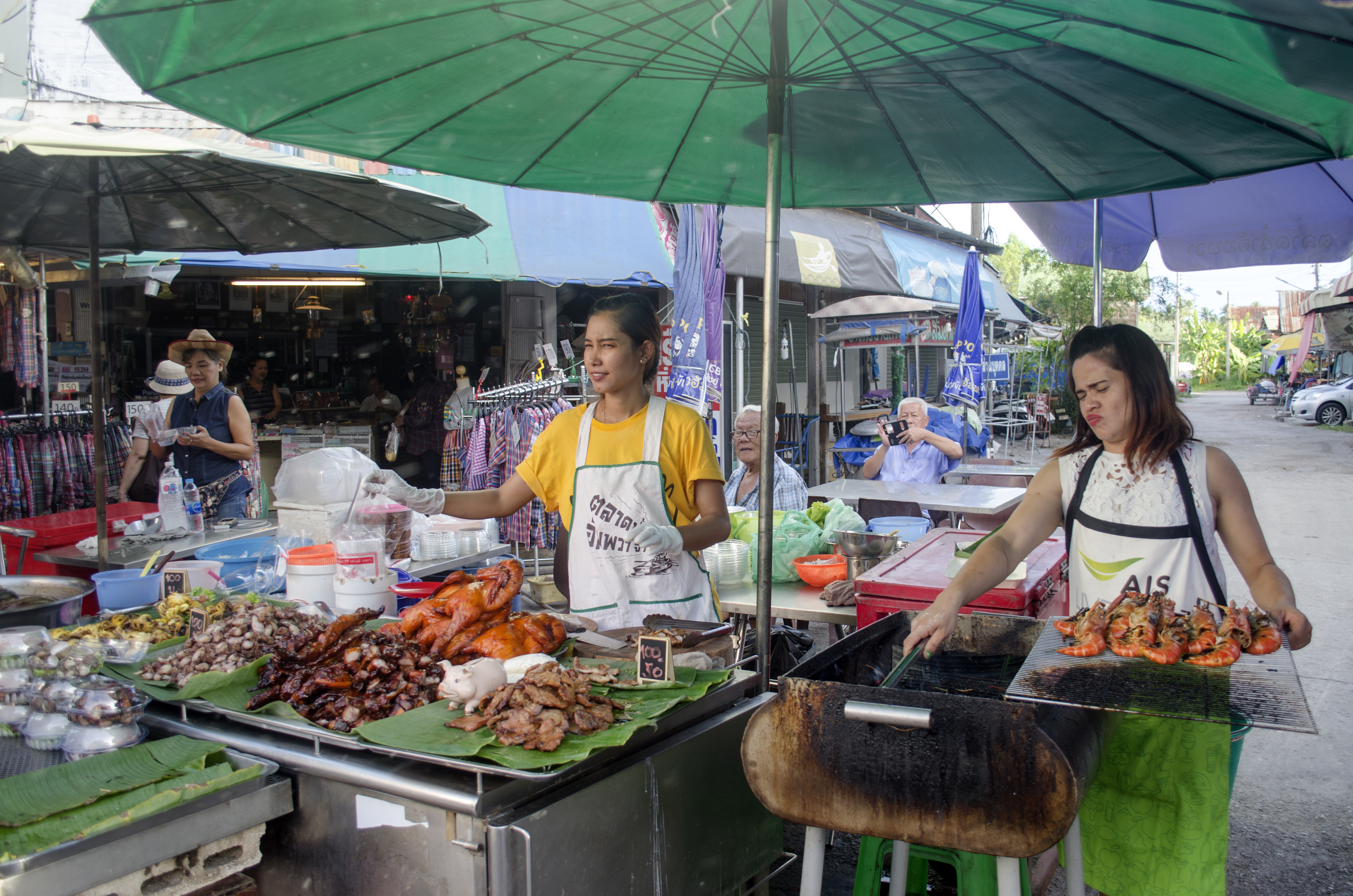
Food stall at Amphawa Floating Market

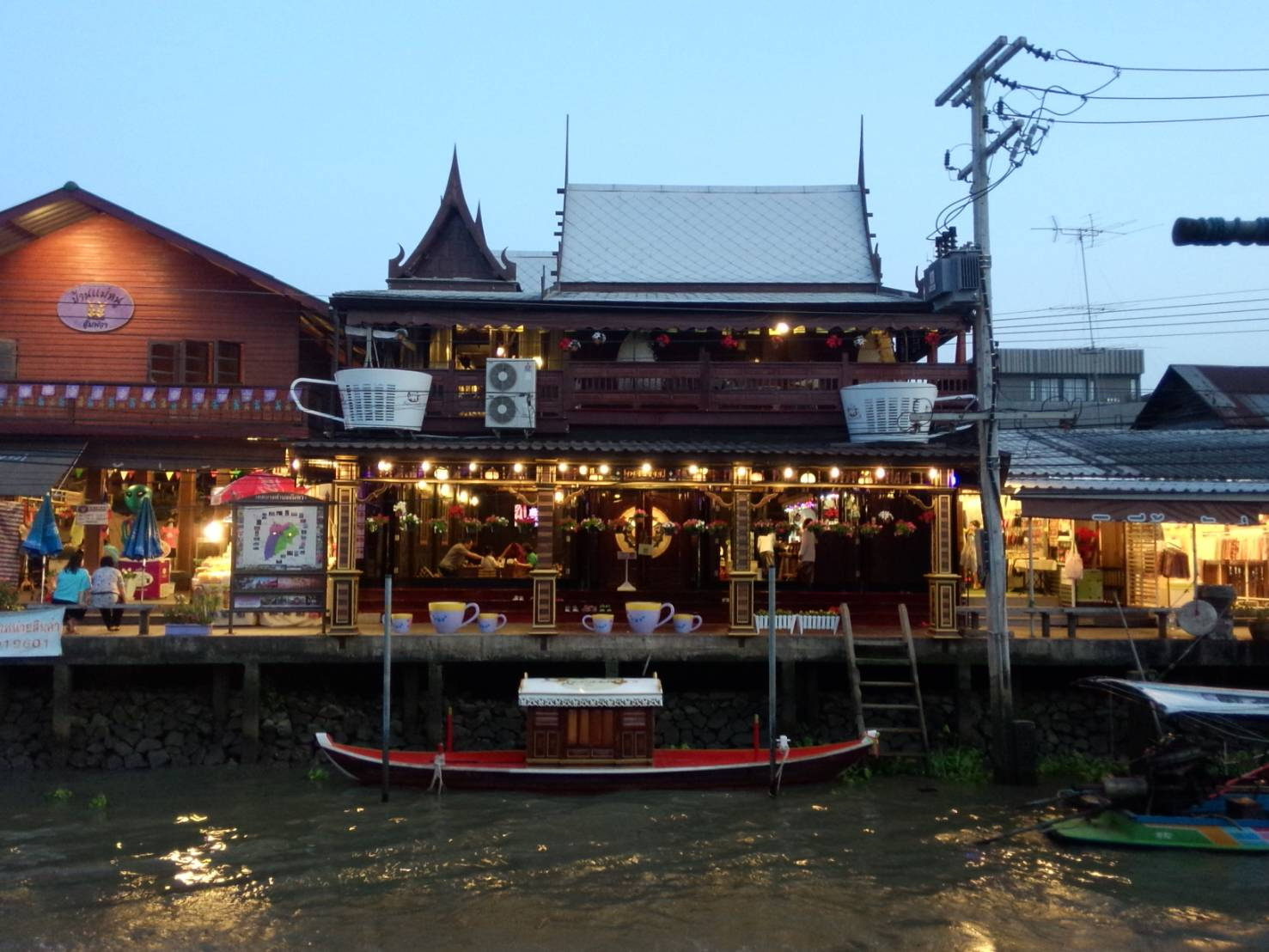
Coffee cafe

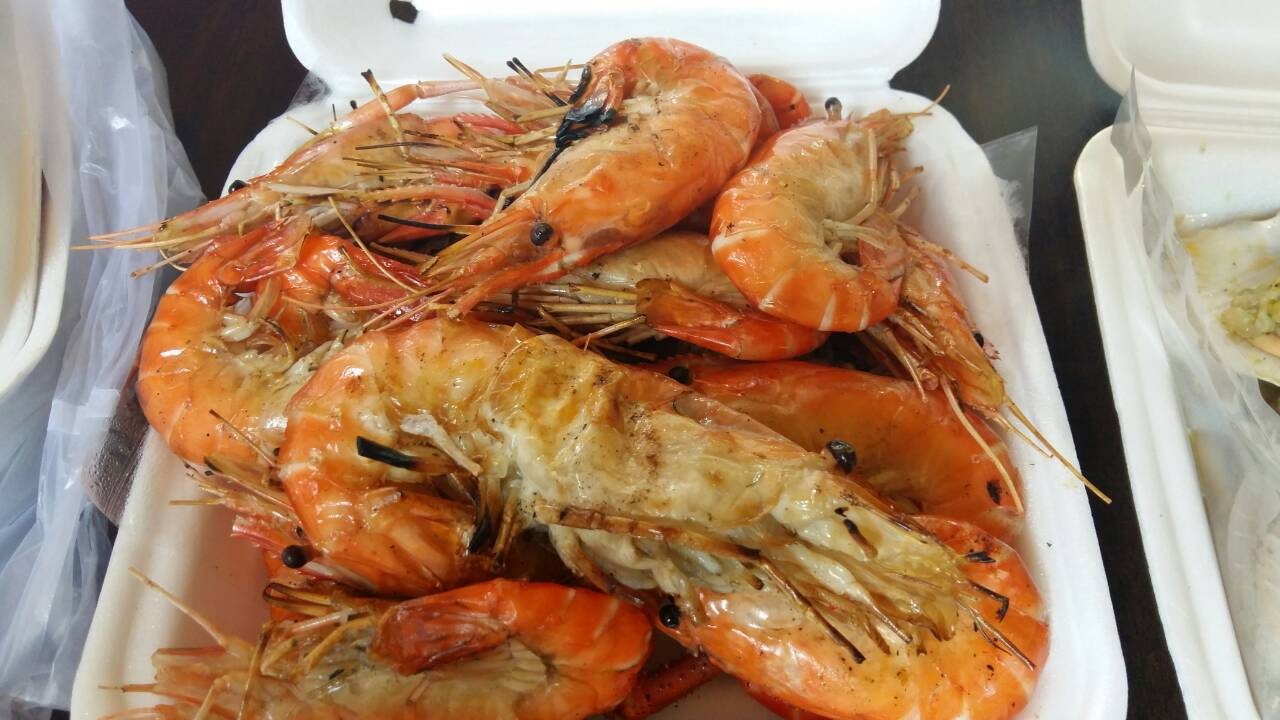
Shrimp

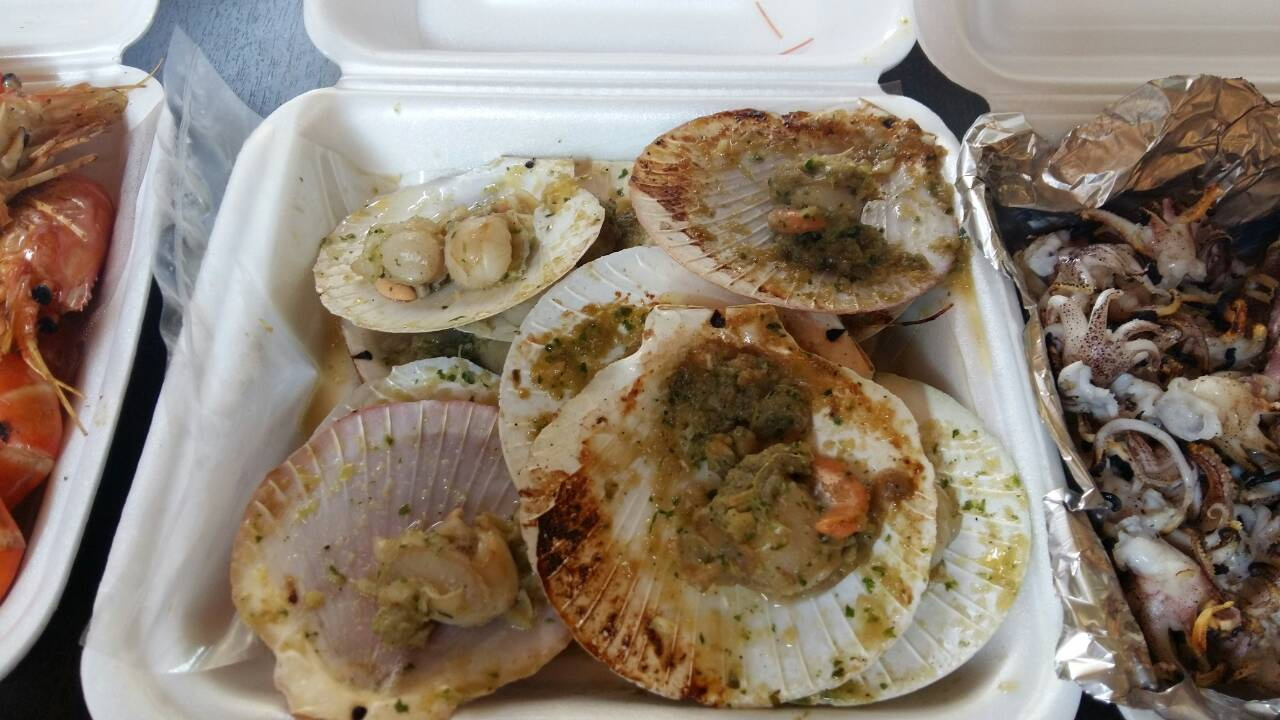
Scallop

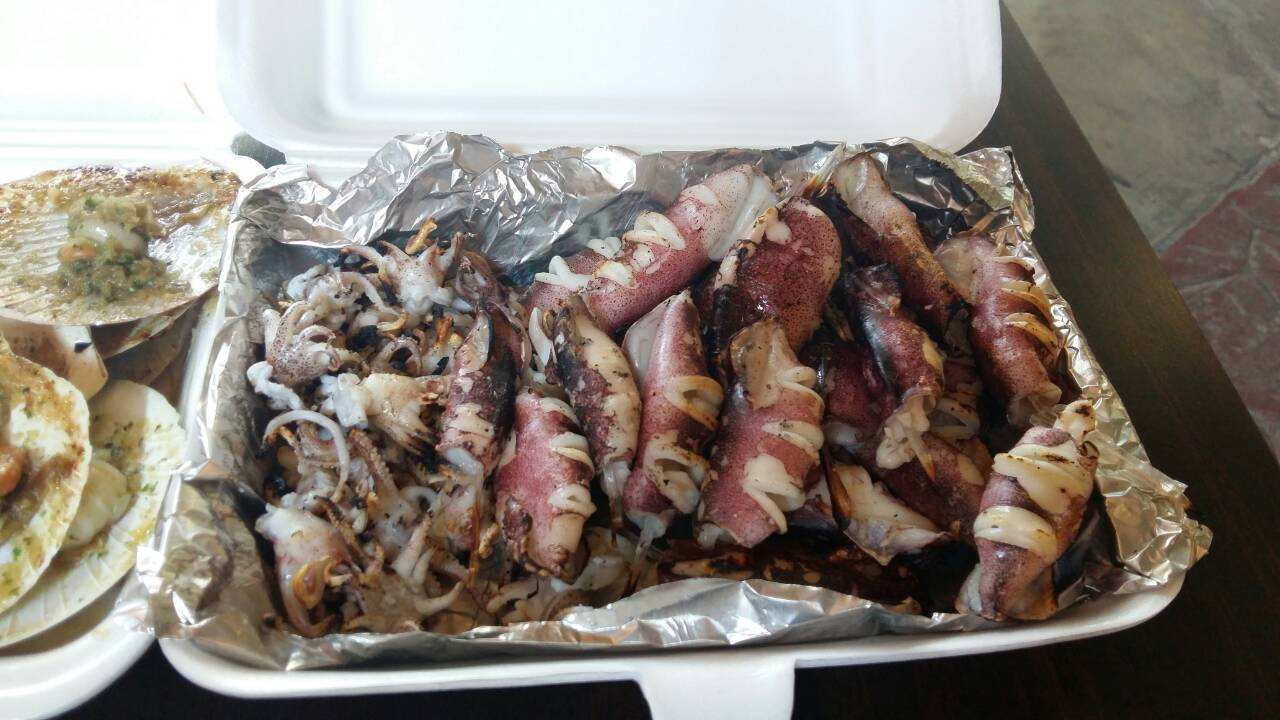
Squid

Food is the main reason people from Bangkok visit the Amphawa floating market. The Amphawa floating market has many shop-house eateries and all kinds of tantalizing tastes. Shapes and smells attract such as seafood, boat noodles, Thai desserts, and other items. Grilled seafood is also as popular as boat noodles. After that, there is a Thai dessert for purchase as a sweet treat.

=== Seafood ===
Seafood is very popular among tourists. Mostly eating seafood grilled on wooden boats moored around the Mae Klong river. From noon until late in the evening, the smell is simply irresistible and customers flock to each side of the river all day long. There are huge prawns, shellfish, scallops, oysters, crabs, fish, and squids in the wooden boats. Sometimes if tourists want to eat in a restaurant, you can walk a bit further from the bridge to find restaurants. Even better, try to get a seat on the balcony of the restaurant next to the bridge, it's the only one around but you might have to wait a while or come early.

=== Thai Dessert ===
Villagers in the town of Amphawa bring local ingredients for making desserts. When tourists walk into the Amphawa Floating Market, they can see a variety of desserts. For example, coconut custard squares, dumplings in coconut cream, Thai caramel, caramelized crisps, egg yolk fudge balls cooked in syrup, sweet shredded egg yolk, Mung bean dessert, coconut milk ice-cream, and others are popular desserts. Most ingredients are grown locally, like coconuts. Coconuts are used to make desserts such as coconut custard squares, coconut milk ice cream and others. Visitors can choose according to their needs.

=== Other ===
Amphawa floating market does not have only seafood and Thai desserts, but it also has other categories of food such as noodles, steak, grilled chicken, Pad Thai, oysters fried in egg batter, papaya salad, and others. Visitors can choose from a variety of food, depending on what they want. In the Amphawa floating market, you can also have coffee for the tourists that are interested.

== Getting There And Back ==
Bangkok is the starting point for Amphawa floating market.

=== Step Travel ===
Car: From Bangkok, take Highway 35 Rama 2 road to Km63. After that turn left at a parallel level road. When you see Samut Songkhram downtown intersection, turn right and turn left across the tracks and turn right at the third traffic light, then turn left again. When you find a white label with 3 big head masks, turn left into the Amphawa district and straight, to find the Siam City route. Drive straight to the high bridge and down, turn left into the Ampawan Temple. You can park a car at the temple.

Bus: From the southern bus station, take the bus 996 Bangkok–Damnoen Saduak. The bus is air-conditioned and goes through the Samut Songkhram province to get to the Amphawa Floating Market. Visitors can take the bus to get to the floating market and the price is 80 baht.

Mini bus: Buses that run from the Victory Monument to the Amphawa Floating Market are the best. There are several bus operators that travel to Amphawa. The price costs between 90 and 100 baht each way and will drop you off right down the street from the market.

=== Work Time ===
Operating days: Friday - Sunday

Operating time: 15.00–22.00 pm

== References ==
- Bangkok.com by hotel.com. Amphawa floating market. Retrieved October 2, 2016. from http://www.bangkok.com/magazine/amphawa.htm
- Home is where your Bag is. A visit to the Amphawa Floating Market. Retrieved October 2, 2016. from https://homeiswhereyourbagis.com/en/amphawa-floating-market-en/
- Stella. Bangkok day trip: Amphawa floating market. Retrieved October 3, 2016. from http://www.stellasout.com/bangkok-day-trip-amphawa-floating market/
- Thailand by hotel.com. Amphawa. Retrieved October 3, 2016. from http://www.thailand-guide.com/amphawa/
- Mark Wiens. Amphawa floating market: the ultimate buoyant utopia. Retrieved October 3, 2016. from https://migrationology.com/amphawa-floating-market-the-ultimate-bouyant-utopia/
