= Don Hoi Lot =

Coordinates: 13°22′N 100°2′E

Designations

Ramsar Wetland
- Designated: 5 July 2001
- Reference no.: 1099

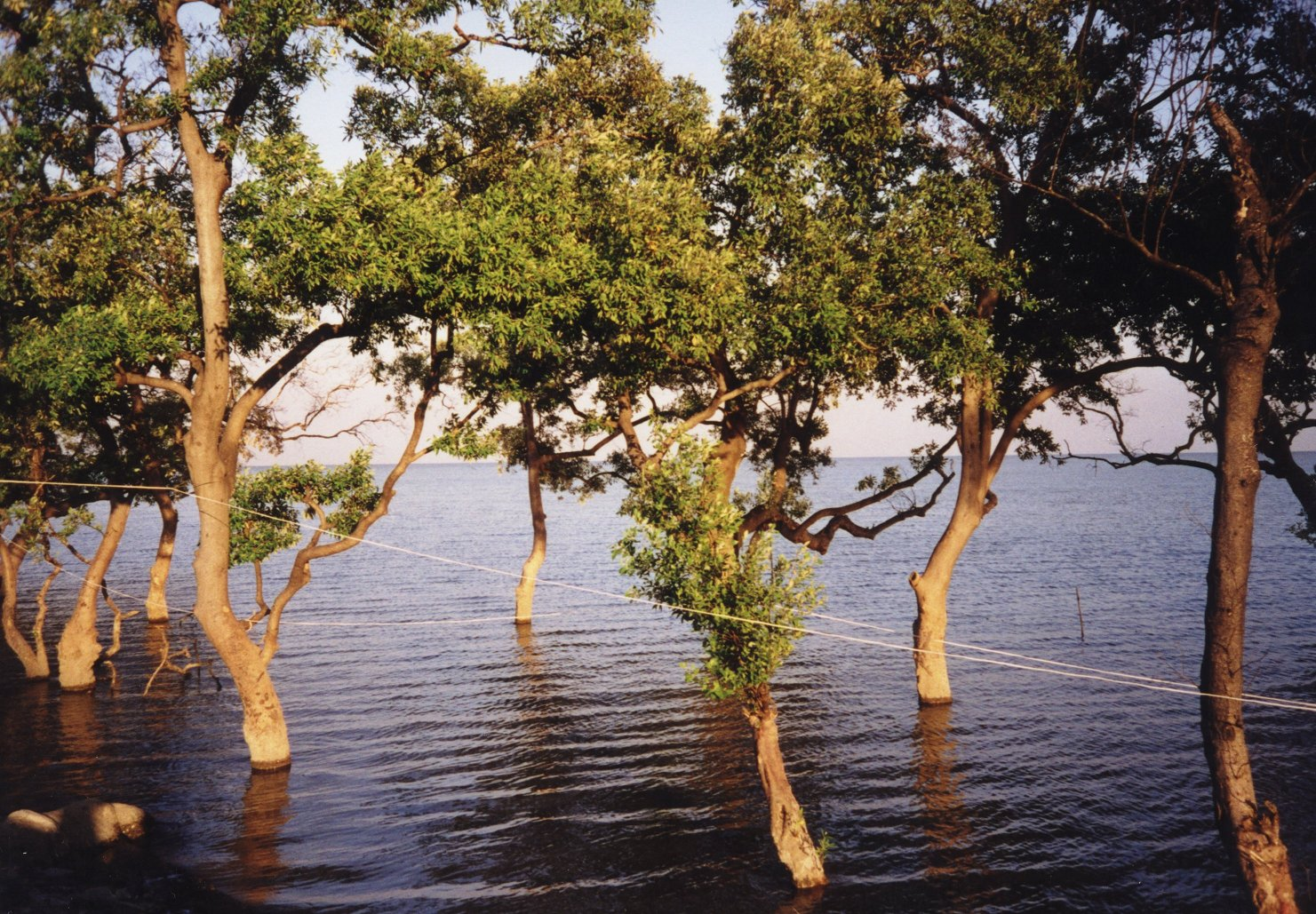
Mangrove trees near Don Nai

Don Hoi Lot (Thai: ดอนหอยหลอด, pronounced [dɔ̄ːn hɔ̌j lɔ̀ːt]) is a sandbar off the coast of Samut Songkhram Province at the northwestern tip of the Bay of Bangkok. The sediments of the Mae Klong River together sediments from the sea form a system of mudflats, which are populated by razor clams (Solen regularis), which also gave the site its Thai name. The site has the largest population of this species, which is endemic to the northern Gulf of Thailand. Also 18 bird and 42 invertebrate species are recorded at the mudflats and the adjoining coastal mangrove forests. The mudflat Don Nai is on the coast. Nearby, the highly revered shrine of Prince Chumphon Khet-Udomsak attracts Thai visitors.

Since 5 July 2001 the site has been registered as Ramsar site number 1099. Don Hoi Lot is named after the tubular shellfish, known as razor clams or "worm shells" in English. the area covers three kilometres in width and five kilometres long in Tambon Bang Chakreng.
