= Amphawa district =

Amphawa อัมพวา
- District
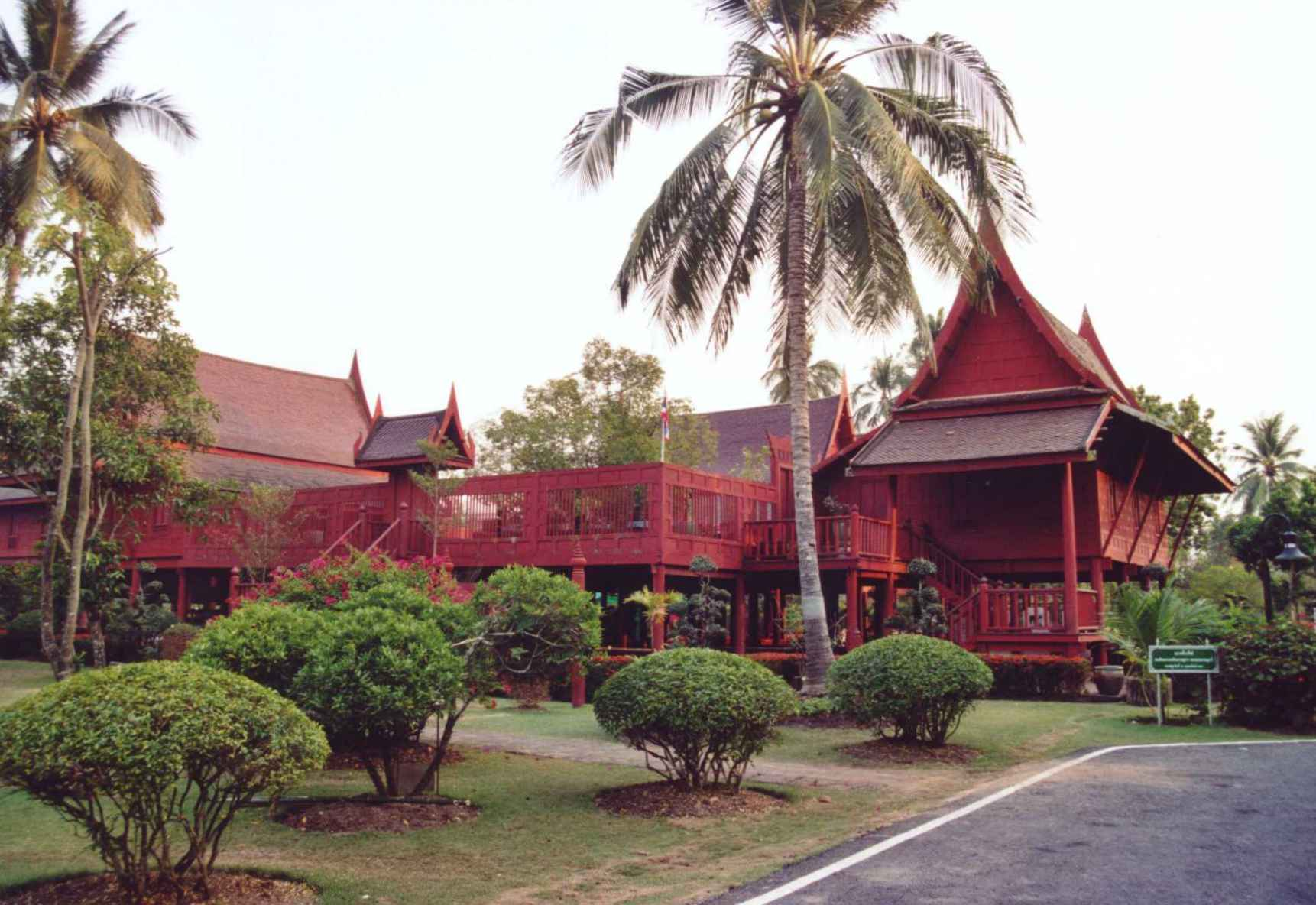
- King Rama II Memorial Park

- District location in Samut Songkhram province
- Coordinates: 13°25′29″N 99°57′26″E
- Country: Thailand
- Province: Samut Songkhram
- Seat: Amphawa

Area
  - Total: 170.2 km^{2} (65.7 sq mi)

Population (2023)
  - Total: 53,576
  - Density: 315/km^{2} (820/sq mi)
- Time zone: UTC+7 (ICT)
- Postal code: 75110
- Calling code: 034
- ISO 3166 code: TH-7503

Amphawa (Thai: อัมพวา, pronounced [ʔām.pʰā.wāː]) is a district (amphoe) of Samut Songkhram province, at the northwestern tip of the Bay of Bangkok (upper Gulf of Thailand).

== Geography ==
Neighboring districts are (from the north clockwise) Bang Khonthi and Mueang Samut Songkhram, Ban Laem and Khao Yoi of Phetchaburi province, Pak Tho and Wat Phleng of Ratchaburi province.

The Mae Klong River flows through the northern part of the district.

Amphawa is regarded as the largest district in the province.

== History ==
In the Ayutthaya period, the area of Amphawa was known as Khwaeng Bang Chang (or just Bang Chang), a small agricultural and commercial community. During the reign of King Prasat Thong the existence of a market is confirmed by sources.

In early Rattanakosin period, Bang Chang was dubbed "Suan Nok" (outer garden), paired with "Suan Nai" (inner garden) or Bangkok. Because they have a very similar terrain, which was filled with orchards and there were many watercourses flowing through the areas.

In those days, the territory of Bang Chang extended to parts of Bang Khonthi, Mueang Samut Songkhram Districts and Damnoen Saduak District in Ratchaburi Province in present day.

The name "Bang Chang" meaning "place of elephants", because it used to be a habitat for many herd of wild elephants and was also a hideout for the white elephants as well. While "Amphawa" after the canal Khlong Amphawa that runs through the district. This word "Amphawa", it is assumed to mean "mango forest" in order to reflect the condition of the area in those days which was full of various orchards such as mango. Hence the seal of the district is an elephant in the mango forest.

In 1766, the later King Buddha Loetla Nabhalai (Rama II) was born in the area, as his father was serving as governor of Ratchaburi at that time. At his birthplace is now a memorial park with four buildings in the traditional style of that area, displaying art as well as lifestyle of that time.

== Administration ==
=== Central government ===
The district is divided into 12 subdistricts (tambons), which are further subdivided into 96 villages (mubans).

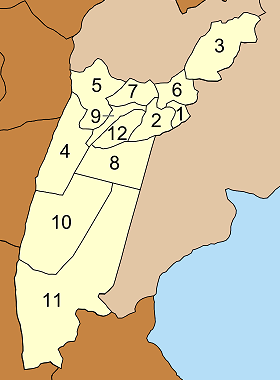
Map of subdistricts

No.	Subdistrict	Thai	Villages	Pop.
1.	Amphawa	อัมพวา	-	4,435
2.	Suan Luang	สวนหลวง	15	4,982
3.	Tha Kha	ท่าคา	12	5,570
4.	Wat Pradu	วัดประดู่	10	5,458
5.	Mueang Mai	เหมืองใหม่	10	4,043
6.	Bang Chang	บางช้าง	9	4,531
7.	Khwae Om	แควอ้อม	8	2,135
8.	Plai Phongphang	ปลายโพงพาง	9	8,270
9.	Bang Khae	บางแค	7	3,707
10.	Phraek Nam Daeng	แพรกหนามแดง	6	4,035
11.	Yisan	ยี่สาร	5	2,828
12.	Bang Nang Li	บางนางลี่	5	3,582
		Total	96	53,576

=== Local government ===
As of December 2024 there are three subdistrict municipalities (thesaban tambon) Suan Luang and Amphawa cover the whole subdistrict and Mueang Mai covers a part of the subdistrict. There are also ten subdistrict administrative organizations - SAO (ongkan borihan suan tambon - o bo to).

Subdistrict municipality	Pop.	website
Suan Luang	4,982	suanluangcity.go.th
Amphawa	4,435	amphawa.go.th
Mueang Mai	1,865	muangmaicity.go.th

Subdistrict adm.org.-SAO	Pop.	website
Plai Phongphang	8,270	plaiphongphang.go.th
Tha Kha	5,570	thakha.go.th
Wat Pradu	5,458	watpradoo.go.th
Bang Chang	4,531	bangchangamphawa.go.th
Phraek Nam Daeng	4,035	phragnamdang.go.th
Bang Nang Li	3,582	bangnanglee.go.th
Bang Khae	3,707	bangkae.go.th
Yisan	2,828	yisan.go.th
Mueang Mai	2,178	mueangmai.go.th
Khwae Om	2,135	kwaeom.go.th

== Healthcare ==
=== Hospital ===
There is Amphawa hospital in the district with 33 beds.

=== Health promoting hospitals ===
There are total seventeen health-promoting hospitals in the district, of which; one in Bang Khae, Phraek Nam Daeng, Yi San and Bang Nang Li, two in Suan Luang, Tha Kha, Wat Pradu, Mueang Mai and Bang Chang, three in Plai Phong Phang.

== Religion ==
There are forty-eight Theravada Buddhist temples in the district.
One in Bang Nang Li, two in Yi San, three in Tha Kha, Wat Pradu, Bang Khae and Phraek Nam Daeng, four in Amphawa, Kwae On and Plai Phong Phang, six in Suan Luang, seven in Bang Chang and nine in Mueang Mai.

== Notable people ==
In addition to King Buddha Loetla Nabhalai, there are still many people born in Amphawa:

- Queen Amarindra: Queen consort of King Phutthayotfa Chulalok (Rama I) and mother of King Buddha Loetla Nabhalai
- Luang Pradit Pairoh: traditional Thai musician
- Eua Sunthornsanan: singer, composer and bandleader of Suntaraporn band
- Toon Tongjai: famous lukthung (Thai country song) singer

== Attractions ==
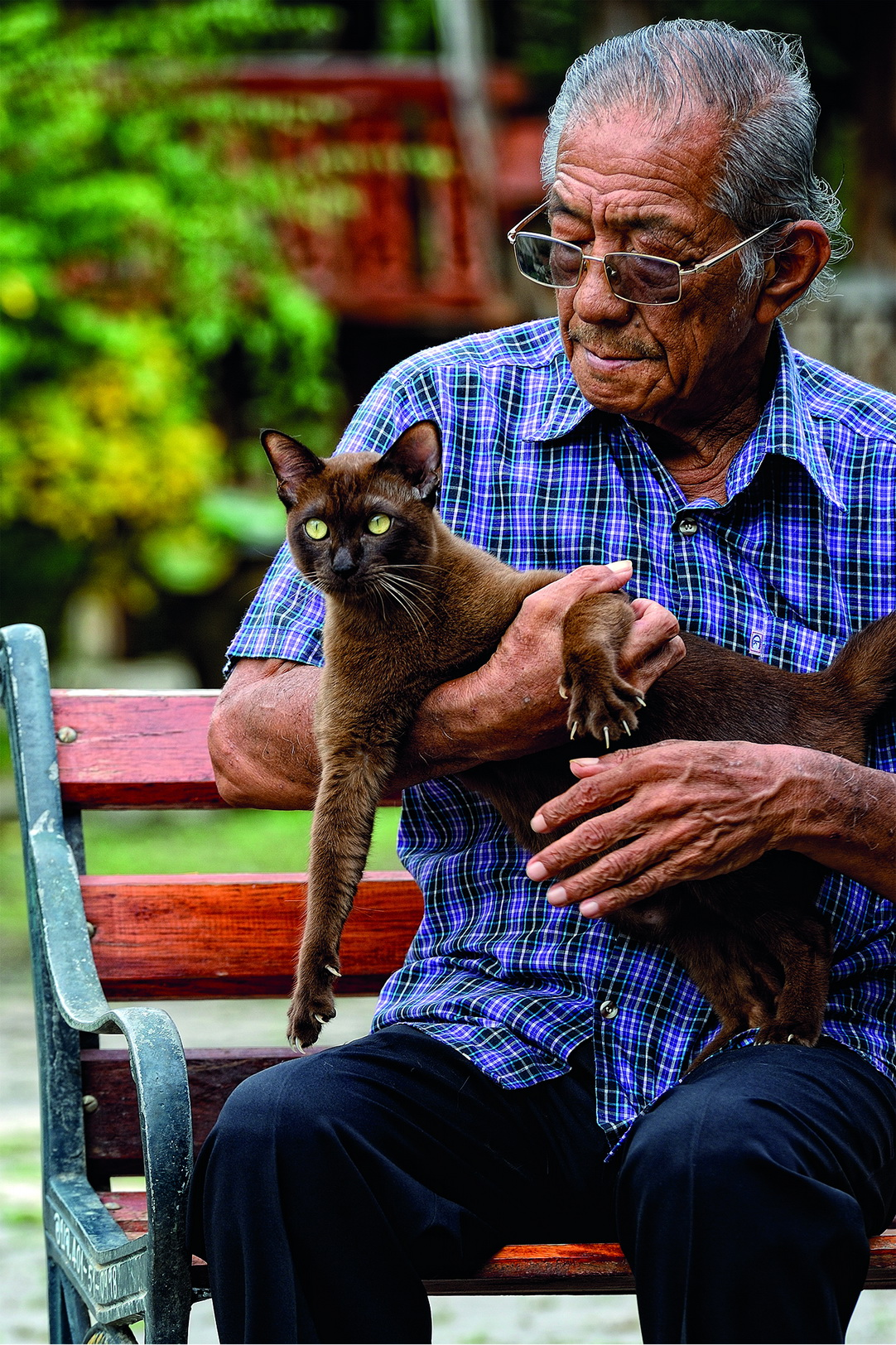
Suphalak and the late founder and breeder, Kamnan Preecha Pukkabut, at Siamese Cat Village

Chuchai Buri Sri Amphawa ('the city of Chuchai in the glory of Amphawa') is a billion baht entertainment complex 500 m from the floating market that features an 18-room hotel, shopping centre, restaurant, and Hindu shine. The building is an outrageous mix of Thai traditional and neoclassical, reminiscent of high society during the late-19th and early-20th centuries. It was built by a wealthy Thai gemstone dealer and designer, Chuchai Chairitthilert, who was bewitched by Amphawa.

Amphawa Floating Market is an afternoon/evening food market held on Fridays, Saturdays, and Sundays on the canals close to Wat Amphawan Chetiyaram.

Tha Kha Floating Market is another floating market besides Amphawa Floating Market, but smaller in size.

King Rama II Memorial Park is four traditional Thai houses. It is arranged in the ethnology style, representing the artifacts in the early of Rattanakosin era that reflects the characteristic of the art and culture, the livelihood, and the living of Thais in the period of King Buddha Loetla Nabhalai. Located next to Amphawa Floating Market.

See the Fireflies popular in the evenings is a boat ride around the waterways to see fireflies.

Wat Bangkae is a temple in Amphawa. It is divided into two temples, Wat Bangkae Noi and Wat Bangkae Yai. It was created by the major wife and minor wife of Royal Sang Wongsaroj (Chao Phraya Surasak). The major wife was the founder of Wat Bangkae Yai. On the wall, it says "On a Sunday in May in 1173 Chula Sakarat, Chao Phraya Surasak (Governor Samuhapraklaopm) and wife built this temple". Wat Bangkae Noi is on the Maeklong River. This temple was founded by Royal Sang Wongsaroj and his minor wife (Jui Wongsaroj). Inside, the temple is made of golden teak wood. The wood was carved with a biography of Lord Buddha, by workers and sculptors from Phetchaburi. They took around 10 years to carve the wood and build the temple. The temple also contains a statue of Somdej Toh which is interesting because Somdej Toh is well-respected among Buddhists. People who visit Amphawa often pay homage to Somdej Toh. In addition, communities around the temples surrounded by Khlong Bangkae are also an agricultural and cultural tourism destination. It has resorts and guesthouses to serve tourists. Visitors can experience the way of life and farming of local people, such as gypsum.

Siamese Cat Village is a traditional Thai wooden house that features exhibits on the four remaining breeds of Siamese cat — Wichien Maat, Korat, Suphalak, Korn Ja (include Khao Manee) combined, more than 130, as well as several real life cats that hang around the house and its surrounding gardens with cute coffee shop. It was run by a kamnan (community leader) who is now dead, but this house is still open for tourists to visit. Each year, there are as many as 800,000 visitors (mostly foreigners). Admission is free but donations are encouraged.
