= Kalae house =

Thai architectural style

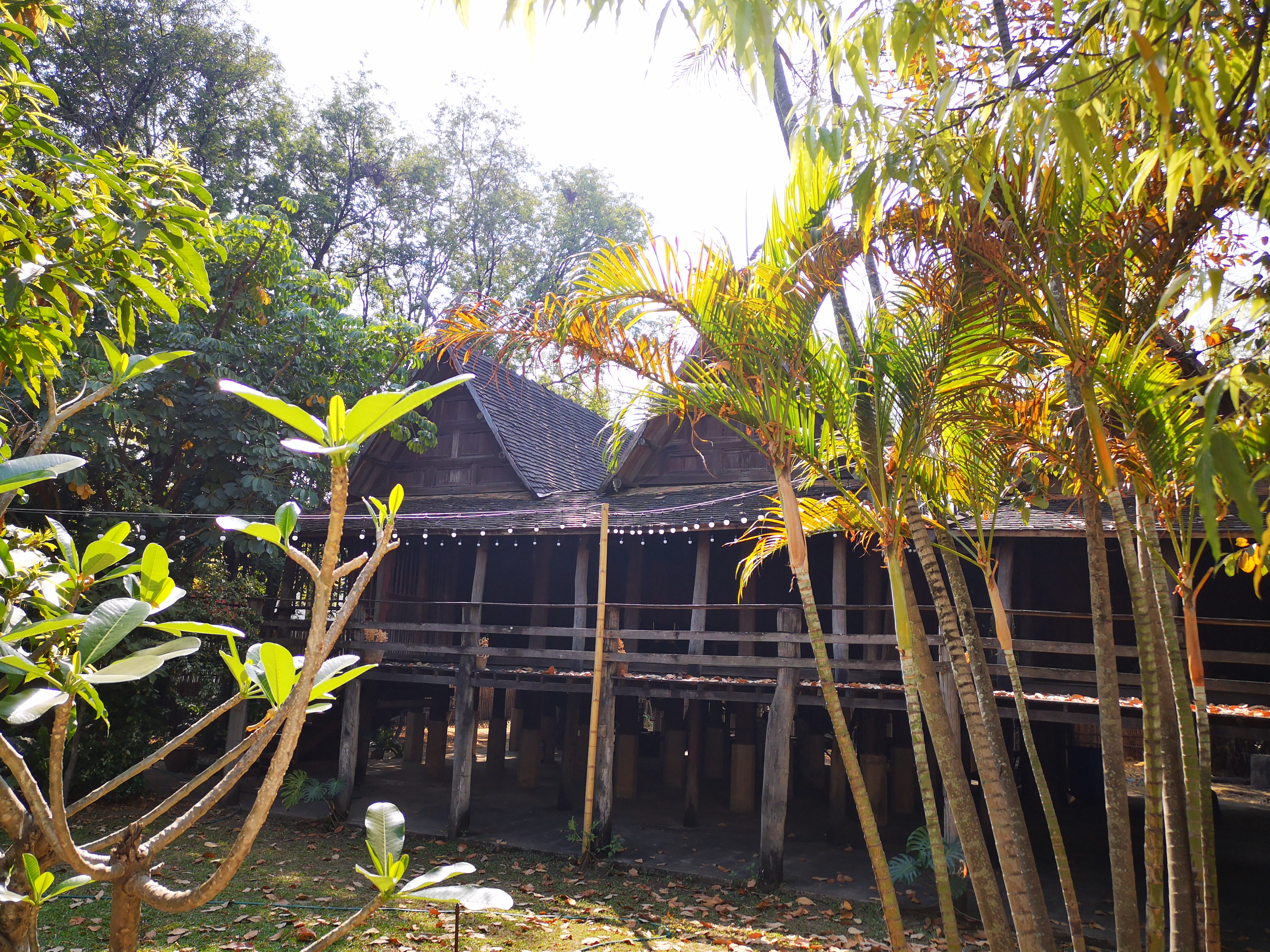
Old Chiangmai Cultural Center

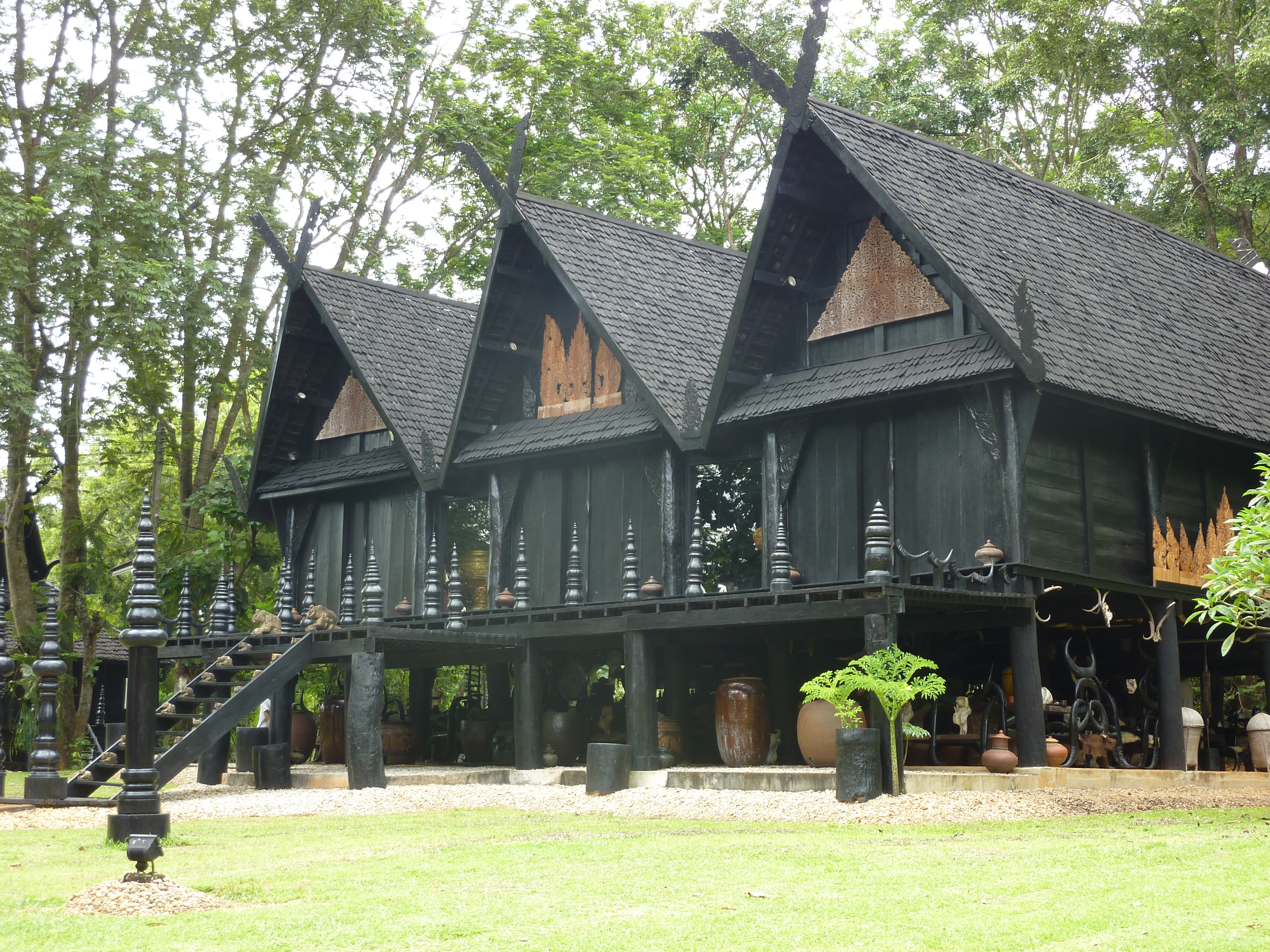
A building group in adapted northern Thai style, at Thawan Duchanee's house in Chiang Rai. Note the kalae roof decorations above the gable.

The kalae house (Thai: เรือนกาแล) or traditional Northern Thai/Lanna house (เรือนไทยภาคเหนือ/ล้านนา) is an architectural style of Northern Thailand, in the area that used to be called Lan Na, today known as Chiang Mai. The house is composed of two compartments sharing the same platform. It is named after the decorative wooden carvings protruding from the top of the gables, features typically found in traditional northern Thai houses.

The house is a combination of traditional Lanna and Tai Lue, TaiKhoen and Tai Yong ethnic groups’ residences. The influences from these peoples makes the houses diverse in terms of style, plan, decoration, development of the functions and house elements.

== History of Kalae ==
The word “Kalae” has a root in the word “Ka-lang”, meaning a crossing over or overlapping. Kalae refers to the carved wooden rack attached to the gables of the house. The wooded rack is extended to form a v-shape at the top of the ridge board. The extended rack is 0.5 metres (1 ft 8 in) in length. Kalae are notable for their engravings, the focus point. Both sides of the etch rack are usually birds. However, the rack can be carved in other patterns.

Kalae used to be the frame designed to hold the roof together because the roof used to be constructed from banana leaf. Later on, when the construction material changed to clay roof tiles, kalae turned into a decorative element.

Kalae houses are designed to serve the daily routines of Lanna households. Furthermore, they indicate the status of the owner and symbolize fortune. Each part of the house serves certain functions. Kalae house characteristics show similarity to traditional Lanna house.

- Relevant beliefs: the construction is based on climate and wind direction. Thai building and living habits are often based on superstitious and religious beliefs. Many other considerations such as locally available materials, climate, and agriculture have a lot to do with the style.
- Relatives share the same land. Families live in the same perimeter surrounded by the fence made from bamboo, called “rua salap”, or bush.

== Location ==
This style of home is primarily located in the northern provinces of Thailand, including Chiang Mai and the nearby districts; Hangdong district, Doi Saket district, Sankampang district, Sanpathong district, Chom Thong district, Mae Rim district, and Mae Thang district.

The house direction is calculated according to the sun with the roof pediment always facing toward the south or the north. Most of the houses are built on larger properties. These homes are not as common as they once were as more modern designs have come into favour.

== Elements ==
=== Proportion ===
Kalae complex has at least two compartments. The main compartment has five rooms. The house has columns aligned with the side of the house. The height measured from the ground to the Waeng or the girder is approximately 1.4 to 1.96 metres (4 ft 7 in to 6 ft 5 in). While the distance measured from the back of the Waeng to the pediment is approximately 2.8 metres (9 ft 2 in).

=== Parts ===
The house is divided according to functions, as shown in the following list.

- Bedroom: bedrooms are on the east wing. It is a large single room extending lengthwise. The room can be partitioned to create space for children by hanging up a large piece of cloth or curtain tied to the pillars. The room is divided into two obvious sections using a piece of timber, mai paen tong, as a divider so that the floorboards won't vibrate and disturb others. On top of the main pillar or sao ek is a wooden shelf purposely built as a shrine for household deity. The Thai notion of fear centres on the "spiritual world" such as "ghosts, unseen forces, and evil spirits". Thai people heavily rely on "supernatural powers" for protection in the domestic setting.
- Kitchen: also known as ruean fai. This area is for cooking and storing utensils.
- Toen or Veranda. The area is connected to the front terrace but one step higher. It is a multipurpose area with a short wooden wall separating the Toen from the bedroom.
- Shan: the terrace. This is the open space in the front. This is used as a washing area and is connected to the kitchen. The front terrace right off the veranda has a stand for water pots, han-nam with coconut shells, which is used to welcome guests.
- Beneath the house: This is called the tai thun ruean. This section is the storage area and is used to keep household implements like farming equipment and household utensils, and is also a place for livestock. As the phrase "Thai stilt house" suggests, one universal aspect of Thailand's traditional architecture is the elevation of its buildings on stilts, most commonly to around head height. The houses were raised due to heavy flooding during certain parts of the year, and in more ancient times, predators.

==== Decoration ====
Kalae are carved into different pattern; three birds, floral pattern, and clouds. The shape of Kalae differs - straight, curvy, and crossed.

== Type of Kalae ==
=== Classification of Kalae ===
The architectural structure of Kalae house is classified into four types regarding their size and style; small Kalae houses, Kalae houses typical in size, large Kalae houses, and large contemporary Kalae houses.

=== Age of Kalae house ===
Kalae houses have been built for more than two centuries. The appearances have changed over time. The development in terms of materials and tools used in construction is the primary contributing factor that causes Kalae house not only to age differently but also develop differently in terms of shape and style.

Early Constructed Kale house	Late Constructed Kalae house
The gables are higher.	The gables are more obtuse. Not so high.
For the houses that are later found, the face of the gables is covered with a sheet of wood built in a form of louver.
Tong; the rectangular wooden beams, running along the length of the house, placed over Waeng or the girders in the vertical position.	Tong is placed horizontally, parallel to Waeng.
The use of nails to nail the structure and the use of hinges to attach the window frame to the wall is popular in the late constructed Kalae house.
The late constructed Kalae houses have more complicated compartment layout.
Roofing over the stairs appears in late constructed Kalae house.

== Example of Kalae house ==
Huean Kalae is a Kalae house built in 1917 and owned by Oui Paad Phothitha of Tambon Paphlu, Chom Thong District, Chiang Mai Province. This small Kalae house has a raised floor made of hardwood. The roof is covered with wooden tiles. The house has three compartments: the largest one on the east is the sleeping area, the smaller one on the west is the kitchen, and the smallest one in the front is the storage for drinking water.

== See also ==
- Traditional Thai house
