= Yisan =

Coordinates: 13°17′45″N 99°52′58″E

Yisan ยี่สาร
- Tambon
- Seal
- Country: Thailand
- Province: Samut Songkhram
- District: Amphawa

Government
  - Type: Subdistrict administrative organization (SAO)

Area
  - Total: 60.9 km^{2} (23.5 sq mi)

Population (2023)
  - Total: 2,828
  - Density: 46/km^{2} (120/sq mi)
- Time zone: UTC+7 (ICT)
- Postal code: 75110
- Calling code: 034
- ISO 3166 code: TH-750311
- Website: yisan.go.th

Yisan (Thai: ยี่สาร, pronounced [jîː.sǎːn]) is a tambon (sub-district) of Amphawa District, Samut Songkhram Province, central Thailand.

== History ==
Its name "ํYisan" after the hill named Yisan, a local stand out limestone hill as well as canal Khlong Yisan, that runs through the area. Khlong Yisan can be regarded as both a natural canal and a man-made canal. In the part of the man-made canal believed to have been dug at the late of King Mongkut (Rama IV)'s reign. It flows from here to the Gulf of Thailand, which is about 5–6 km (3.1–3.7 mi) away.

The word Yisan presumably derived from "Pasan" (ปสาน) which distorted from the word "Bazaar" in Persian, which means marketplace. Because Yisan has been a center of commerce since ancient times and was a junk boat stop. While some academic believe that the word Yisan is likely to come from Chinese "一 山" (pinyin: Yī shān), which means "one hill".

Yisan's history is older than other areas of Samut Songkhram. Yisan community dates back to the Ayutthaya period there are many excavations of ancient pottery found. Its name appears in the records of two foreigners since the early Rattanakosin period, namely Jean-Baptiste Pallegoix a French cleric which he spelled the name of Yisan as Isan, and Scottish's John Crawfurd.

There is a folk tale telling about the three Chinese brothers who sailed to Siam (now Thailand). But the junk had sunk before reaching the shore, the three brothers then swim, scattered in different directions and separated to live in different places. The oldest brother went to live in the Khao Takhrao, Ban Laem District and last brother went to live in Khao Iko, Khao Yoi District, Phetchaburi Province. While the middle brother went to live in Yisan and became Phophu Si Racha, a sacred Buddha image at Wat Khao Yisan in present day.

Previously, Yisan residents does not contain fresh water for consumption, because the water source of this area is brackish water. Therefore, causing locals to have a career that is different from the normal is to row a boat to pump fresh water from other areas such as Khao Takhrao, Bang Tabun in Phetchaburi Province. This occupation was called "lom nam" (ล่มน้ำ). Like other traditional professions, this occupation is about to disappear because of the replacement of tap water.

== Geography ==
Most of the area is mangrove forest approximately 27 km (17 mi) from center of Amphawa District, and 79 km (49 mi) from Bangkok. Considered to be the largest and southernmost part of the district.

Yisan is believed to have been a small island in the Gulf of Thailand, which was close to the mainland. Until there has been a change in geological ridge, eventually became a part of the mainland.

Neighboring sub-districts are (from the north clockwise): Plai Phongphang in its district, Bang Tabun of Ban Laem District, Phetchaburi Province and Khlong Khon in Mueang Samut Songkhram District, Samut Songkhram Province, Bang Khem of Khao Yoi District, Phetchaburi Province, and Phraek Nam Daeng in its district.

== Administration ==
=== Provincial government ===
The administration of Yisan subdistrict is responsible for an area that covers 38,063 rai ~ 60.9 square kilometres (23.5 sq mi) and consists of five villages (muban), as of December 2023: 2,828 people and 1,134 households.

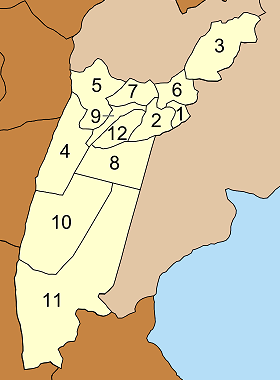
Map of Amphawa district Yisan is no. 11

| Village | Name | Thai | People |
|---|---|---|---|
| Moo1 | Ban Khao Yisan | บ้านเขายี่ลาร | 702 |
| Moo2 | Ban Klong Ban Nok | บ้านคลองบ้านนอก | 350 |
| Moo3 | Ban Ton Lamphan | บ้านต้นลำแพน | 513 |
| Moo4 | Ban Dok Chan | บ้านดอกจัน | 546 |
| Moo5 | Ban Klong Khut Lek | บ้านคลองขุดเล็ก | 717 |
| | | Total | 2,828 |

=== Local government ===
Yisan is administered by the Yisan subdistrict administrative organization - SAO (ongkan borihan suan tambon - o bo to), which covers the whole subdistrict.

== Economy ==
Most Yi San residents work in aquaculture, such as shrimp, shellfish, sea crab and fish.

== Healthcare ==
There is Wat Khao health-promoting hospital in Moo1.

== Education ==
There are two primary/secondary schools in the subdistrict.

- Ban Don Chan school
- Wat Khao Yisan school

== Temples ==
The following active temples, where Theravada Buddhism is practised by local residents:

| Temple name | Thai | Location |
|---|---|---|
| Wat Khao Yisan | วัดเบายีสาร | Moo1 |
| Wat Bunnak Prachasan | วัดบุนาคประชาสรรค์ | Moo3 |

== Places ==
- Wat Khao Yisan, an ancient temple on the top of Yisan hill where enshrined the replica four overlapping footprints of the Buddha and a sacred Buddha image Phophu Si Racha with Ban Khao Yisan Local Museum.

== Local products ==
- Local sweets
- Deep fried tilapia
- Bark dyeing fabrics
