= King Rama II Memorial Park =

Park in Samut Songkhram province, Thailand

Coordinates: 13.4249°N 99.9515°E

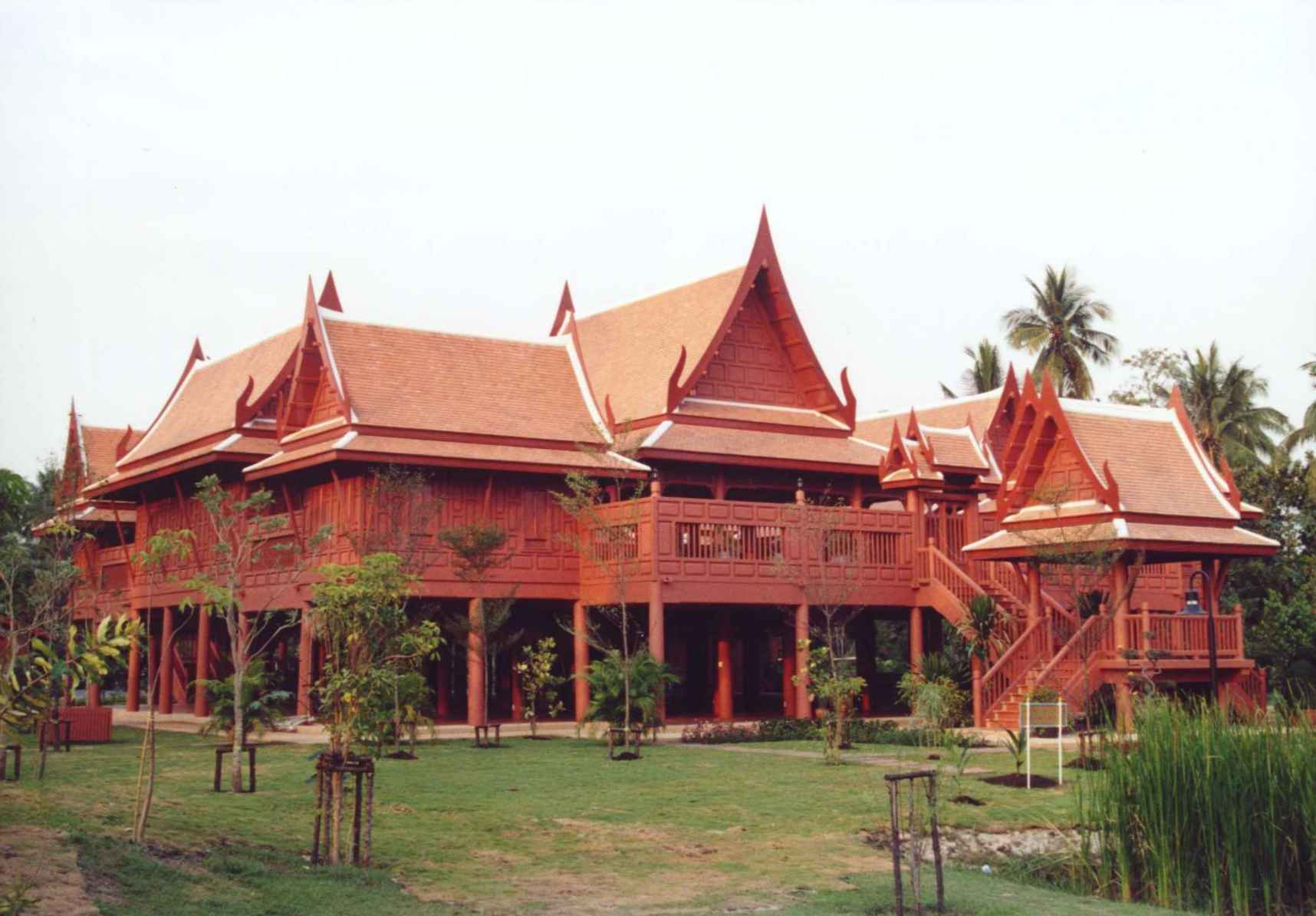
The traditional Thai house in the park

The King Rama II Memorial Park is in the Amphawa District of Thailand's Samut Songkhram Province. It serves as a memorial for King Phutthaloetla Naphalai (Rama II) and his patronage of Thai art and culture. The King Rama II Museum and a large traditional Thai house are located within the grounds of the park.
