= Bang Chang, Samut Songkhram =

Coordinates: 13°25′59.3″N 99°58′06.2″E

Bang Chang บางช้าง
- Tambon
- Seal
- Country: Thailand
- Province: Samut Songkhram
- District: Amphawa

Government
  - Type: Subdistrict administrative organization (SAO)

Area
  - Total: 4.39 km^{2} (1.69 sq mi)

Population (2023)
  - Total: 4,531
  - Density: 1,032/km^{2} (2,670/sq mi)
- Time zone: UTC+7 (ICT)
- Postal code: 75110
- Calling code: 034
- ISO 3166 code: TH-750306
- Website: bangchangamphawa.go.th

Bang Chang (Thai: บางช้าง, pronounced [bāːŋ t͡ɕʰáːŋ]) is a subdistrict (tambon) of Amphawa district, Samut Songkhram province, central Thailand.

== History ==
Bang Chang's history dates to the Ayutthaya Kingdom. During that time, Bang Chang was the name of entirety Samut Songkhram province, its area covered to parts of Bang Khonthi and Mueang Samut Songkhram districts with Damnoen Saduak district in Ratchaburi province as well.

Between Ayutthaya to early Rattanakosin periods, Bang Chang was dubbed "Suan Nok" (outer garden), paired with "Suan Nai" (inner garden) or Bangkok. Because they have a very similar terrain, which was filled with orchards and there was many watercourses flowing through both areas.

Bang Chang has long been known for being an area for agriculture, especially mango.

Its name "Bang Chang" meaning "place of elephants", because it used to be a habitat for many herd of wild elephants and was also a hideout for the white elephants.

Until the establishment of Amphawa district officially, Bang Chang were reduced to subdistrict and changed the name to "Pak Ngam" (ปากง่าม), consisting of 12 administrative villages.

In the year 1941, its name therefore changed again to Bang Chang in accordance with the original name. Khun Bang Chang (ขุนบางช้าง) was the first head of the subdistrict.

Bang Chang was also the birthplace of Amarindra, the Queen Consort of King Phutthayotfa Chulalok (Rama I), and the mother of King Phutthaloetla Naphalai (Rama II). She was also the origin of the royal family surname na Bang Chang (ณ บางช้าง).

== Geography ==
The lowland area has a majority of horticulture.

Neighboring subdistricts are (from the north clockwise): Bang Phrom of Bang Khonthi district, Khlong Khoen and Ban Prok of Mueang Samut Songkhram district, Amphawa and Khwae Om in its district.

Bang Chang is located 8 km (4.97 mi) from the downtown Samut Songkhram.

== Economy ==
Most Bang Chang residents work in agriculture.

== Administration ==
=== Provincial government ===
The administration of Bang Chang subdistrict is responsible for an area that covers 2,745 rai ~ 4.39 square kilometres (1.69 sq mi) and consists of nine villages (muban), as of December 2023: 4,531 people and 1,874 households.

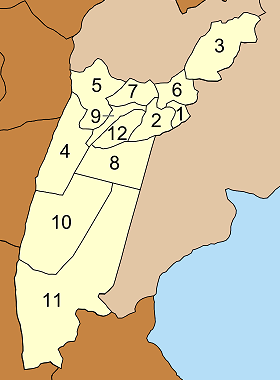
Map of Amphawa district Bang Chang is no. 6

Village	Name	Thai	People
Moo1	Ban Khlong Lat Ta Chot	บ้านคลองลัดตาโชติ	278
Moo2	Ban Khlong Bang Chak	บ้านคลองบางจาก	257
Moo3	Ban Bang Chak	บ้านบางจาก	358
Moo4	Ban Khlong Suan Luang	บ้านคลองสวนหลวง	279
Moo5	Ban Khlong Suan Luang	บ้านคลองสวนหลวง	436
Moo6	Ban Khlong Dao Dueng	บ้านคลองดาวดึงษ์	599
Moo7	Ban Wat Pa Kham	บ้านวัดป่ากง่าม	717
Moo8	Ban Wat Langka	บ้านวัดลังกา	411
Moo9	Ban Khlong Wat Chulamani	บ้านคลองวัดจุฬามณี	1,196
		Total	4,531

=== Local government ===
Bang Chang is administered by the Bang Chang subdistrict administrative organization - SAO (ongkan borihan suan tambon - o bo to), which covers the whole subdistrict.

== Healthcare ==
There are Bang Chang and Wat Daowadung health-promoting hospitals in Moo5 and Moo6.

== Temples ==
The following active temples, where Theravada Buddhism is practised by local residents:

Temple name	Thai	Location
Wat Alongkorn	วัดอลงกรณ์	Moo1
Wat Bang Phrom	วัดบางพรหม	Moo5
Wat Chang Phueak	วัดช้างเผือก	Moo5
Wat Daowadung	วัดดาวดึงษ์	Moo6
Wat Phraya Yadi	วัดพระยาญาดิ	Moo7
Wat Lanka	วัดลังกา	Moo8
Wat Chulamani	วัดจุฬามณี	Moo9

== Local products ==
- Traditional Thai sweets
- Benjarong (traditional five-coloured Thai ceramics)
- Bang Chang bird's eye chilli
- Shredded tobacco
