= Amarindra =

Amarindra; อมรินทรา

Consort of the Siamese monarch
- Tenure: 6 April 1782 – 7 September 1809
- Born: Nak Na Bangxang; 15 March 1737; Amphawa, Ayutthaya
- Died: 25 May 1826 (aged 89); Bangkok, Siam
- Spouse: Phutthayotfa Chulalok (Rama I)
- Issue: Phutthaloetla Naphalai (Rama II); Maha Senanurak (Chui); 8 other sons and daughters
Posthumous name
- Krom Somdet Phra Amarindra Mat; (granted by Rama II)
- Dynasty: Chakri (by marriage)
- Father: Thong Na Bangxang
- Mother: Rupsirisophak Mahanaknari
- Religion: Theravada Buddhism

Amarindra (Thai: อมรินทรา, RTGS: Amarinthra, Amarindrā; 15 March 1737 – 25 May 1826) was the consort of King Phutthayotfa Chulalok (Rama I), the founder of the Chakri dynasty. Her birth name was Nak (นาค). She was a daughter of a wealthy Mon from Bang Chang, in Samut Songkhram Province. Later, she was posthumously granted the title of the first Queen Consort of the Chakri dynasty by King Vajiravudh (Rama VI), as the mother of King Phutthaloetla Naphalai (Rama II).

== Biography ==
Nak was born in 1737 to a local patron of Bang Chang named Thong and his wife San. She was then married to Thong Duang the Luang Yokkrabat of Ratchaburi (future Rama I) around 1760 to avoid being taken as a court lady to King Ekkathat. She had three sons and seven daughters by Thong Duang. Her sister, Nuan, was married to Bunnag – the progenitor of Bunnag family.

Thong Duang was granted the title Somdet Chao Phraya by King Taksin in 1776. In 1779, the Somdet Chao Phraya went on his campaigns against Vientiane and took a daughter of King Suriyavong of Vientiane as his concubine – Kamwaen. Kam Waen became Somdet Chao Phraya's favorite much to the dismay of Nak. One day, she beat Kam Waen with a wooden stick and Kam Waen ran for the Somdet Chao Phraya. The Somdet Chao Phraya was enraged with the incident and threatened to murder Nak with a sword, only with the help of her son Chim (the future Rama II) was Nak able to flee to the Thonburi Palace to live with her daughter Chimyai (concubine to King Taksin).

After the incident, Nak and the king had never came into reconciliation. Lady Nak stayed in the Thonburi Palace with her daughter and, after her daughter's death in 1779, took care of her children including Prince Kasatranuchit. The Somdet Chao Phraya became a monarch in 1782 and most of Taksin's sons were executed except for Prince Kasatranuchit who was his own grandson. Lady Nak and her grandsons moved to her former residence and had never received any royal titles. She occasionally went to the Grand Palace to visit her daughters.

In 1809, King Rama I died and was succeeded by his son Rama II who raised his mother Nak to the rank of queen – Krom Somdet Phra Amarindramat (Thai: กรมสมเด็จพระอมรินทรามาตย์) the Queen Mother - and moved to the Grand Palace. However, Prince Kasatranuchit was found to be in a rebellion and was executed along with his siblings and sons. She lived to see her grandson crowned as Rama III and outlived all her children. Queen Amarindra died in 1826.

Queen Amarindra was later raised to Somdet Phra Amarindra Boromma Rajini (Thai: สมเด็จพระอมรินทราบรมราชินี) by King Vajiravudh.

Queen Amarindra had a total ten children with King Rama I; three sons and seven daughters

1. A princess (died in Ayutthaya period)
2. A prince (died in Ayutthaya period)
3. Princess Chimyai (1765–1779) royal concubine to Taksin, King of Thonburi
4. Prince Chim (1767–1824) The Prince Itsarasunthon, The Viceroy of His Majesty King Rama I
5. Princess Chaem (1770–1808) The Princess Sisunthornthep
6. A princess (died in Thonburi period)
7. Prince Chui (1773–1817) The Prince Senanurak The Viceroy of His Majesty King Rama II
8. A princess (died in Thonburi period)
9. A princess (died in Thonburi period)
10. Princess Prapaiwadi (1777–1823) The Princess Thepayawadi

== In popular culture ==
- Portrayed by Pirawan Prasopsart in the 1984 CH3 TV drama Taharn Suea Phra Chao Tak
- Portrayed by Salinee Pakdeepol in the 2007 CH3 TV drama Taksin Maharat
- Portrayed by Sawika Chaiyadech in the 2019 True4U film series Sri Ayodhaya part 2

Thai royalty
Preceded by Batboricha (of Thonburi)	Consort of the Siamese monarch 1782–1809	Succeeded by Sri Suriyendra
Honorary titles
Preceded by The Princess Narindradevi	Eldest Royal Member of the Chakri Dynasty; 1810–1826	Succeeded by The Princess Narindradevi
