= Traditional Thai house =

Collection of Thai architectural styles

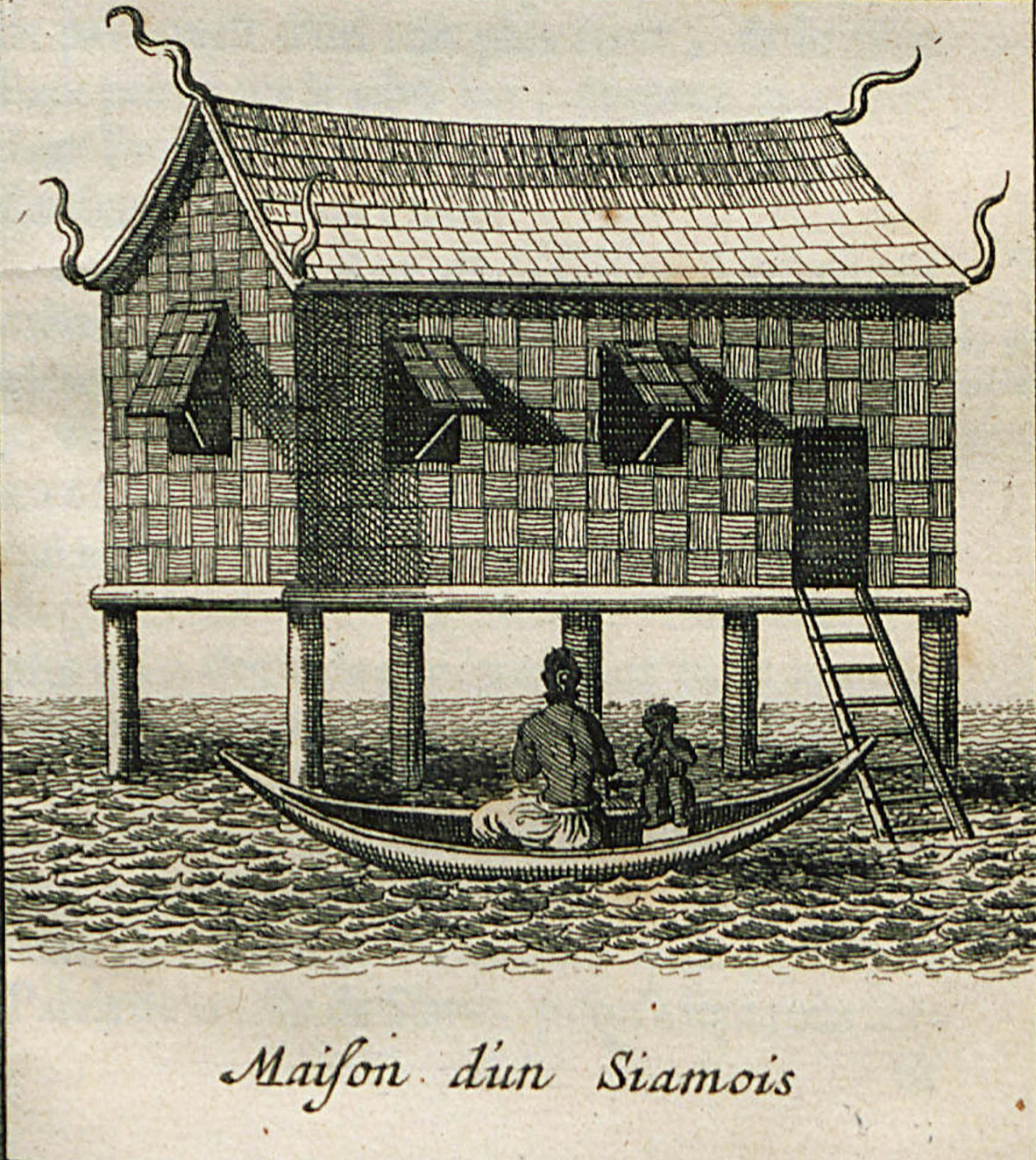
Traditional Thai (Siamese) house depicted by Simon de la Loubere during his mission to Siam (now Thailand) between 1687-88 AD.

The traditional Thai house (Thai: เรือนไทย, RTGS: ruean thai, pronounced [rɯ̄a̯n tʰāj]; lit. 'Thai house') is a loose collection of vernacular architectural styles employed throughout the different regions of Thailand. Thai houses usually feature a bamboo or wooden structure, raised on stilts and topped with a steep gabled roof. The houses from each of Thailand's regions have distinctive styles, which reflect the people's living style, including social and cultural beliefs or religious customs and occupations.

== Construction ==
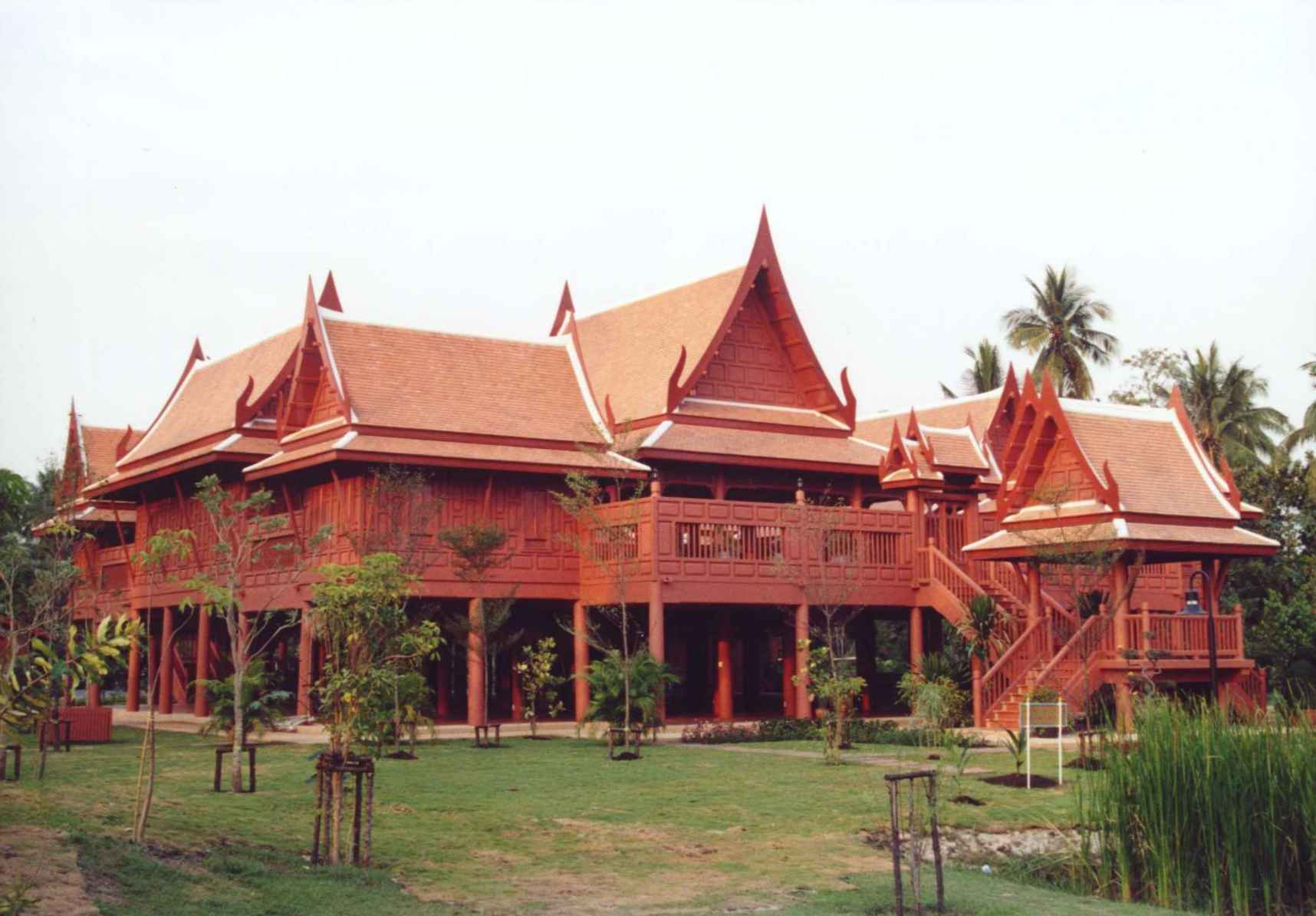
The traditional Thai house at King Rama II Memorial Park

Using renewable natural materials including timber and bamboo, the dwellings are often built without the use of metal including nails. Instead pre-cut holes and grooves are used to fit the timber elements into one another, effectively making it a 'prefabricated house'.

== Regional house style ==
=== Central Thai traditional house style ===
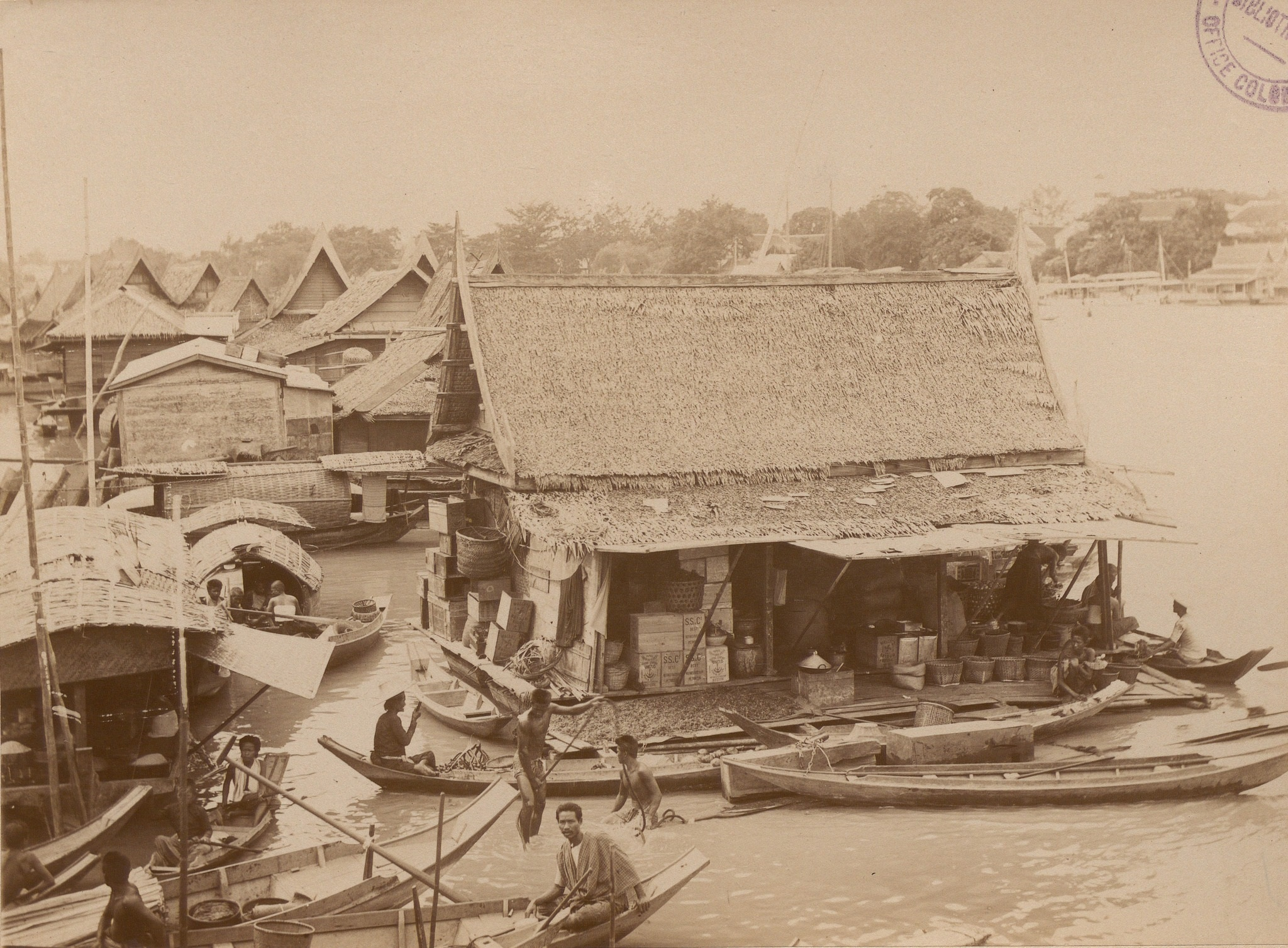
Thai Stilt Houses on the Chao Phraya River in Bangkok, 1889

Thai stilt houses in the central region are divided into five types. The first type is the single house, which is the stilt house for a single family and includes bedroom and kitchen. The second type is a group house, which is the stilt house that has at least two buildings in the same area. The next type is the official house or stilt house for government officer. “Pathway store” and “waterfront” store stilt houses are the type of stilt houses that are built for trading. The final type is the raft house which is built near the coast or a river.

The structure of the stilt house in the central region is the most common and of very simple style. The high gable roof which in its center has a shape like the halo of the sun is the most outstanding structure, where there is a space for cooking smoke to flow out. The long overhanging eaves can protect from sun or rain. The wide terrace outside the house is suitable for summer use. In addition, a more important structure is the high open space under the house which is supported by many poles. This space is the area for storage of tools or agricultural equipment, parking, eating meals and other activities.

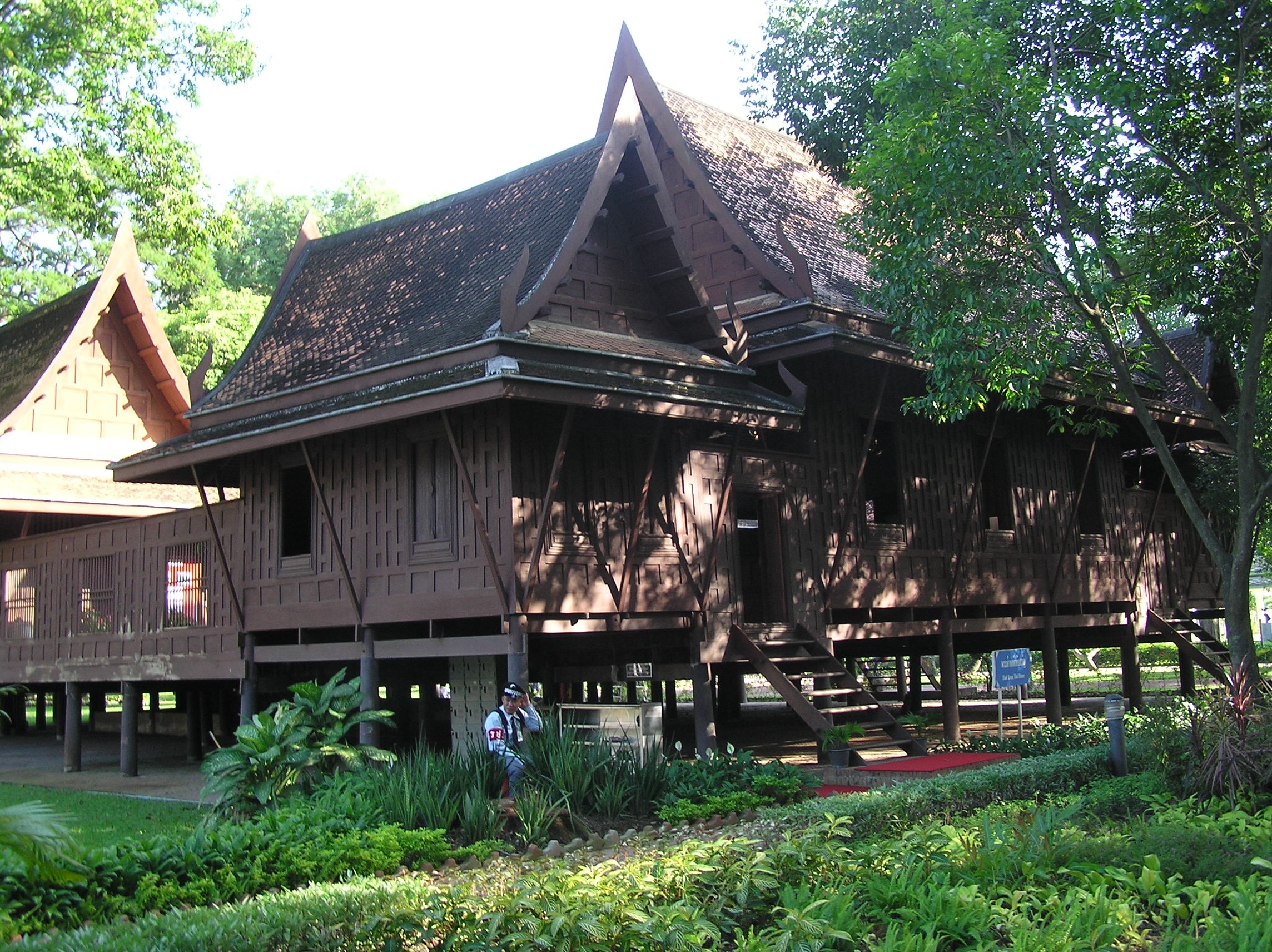
Thap Khwan Residence and garden, one of the residence in Sanam Chan Palace, Nakhon Pathom.

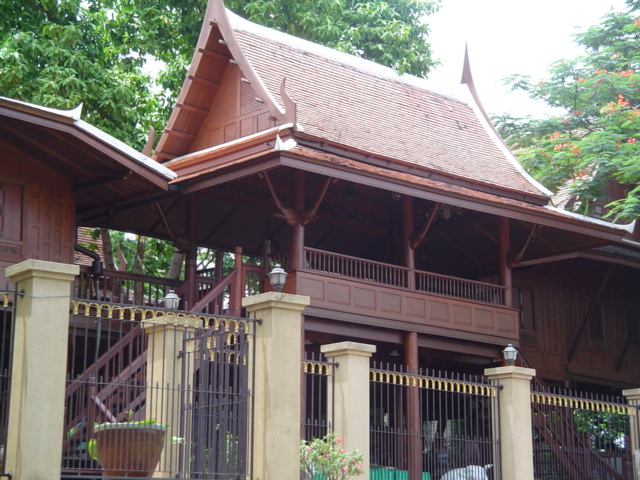
Jim Thompson house, Pathumwan.

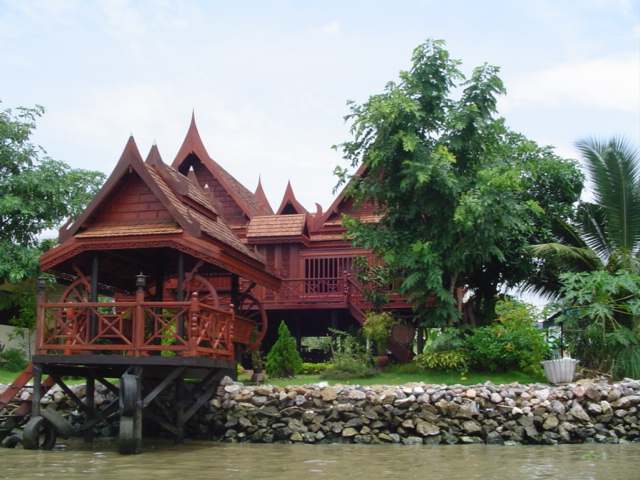
Traditional Thai-style stilt house on a canal near the Chao Phraya River in Bangkok.

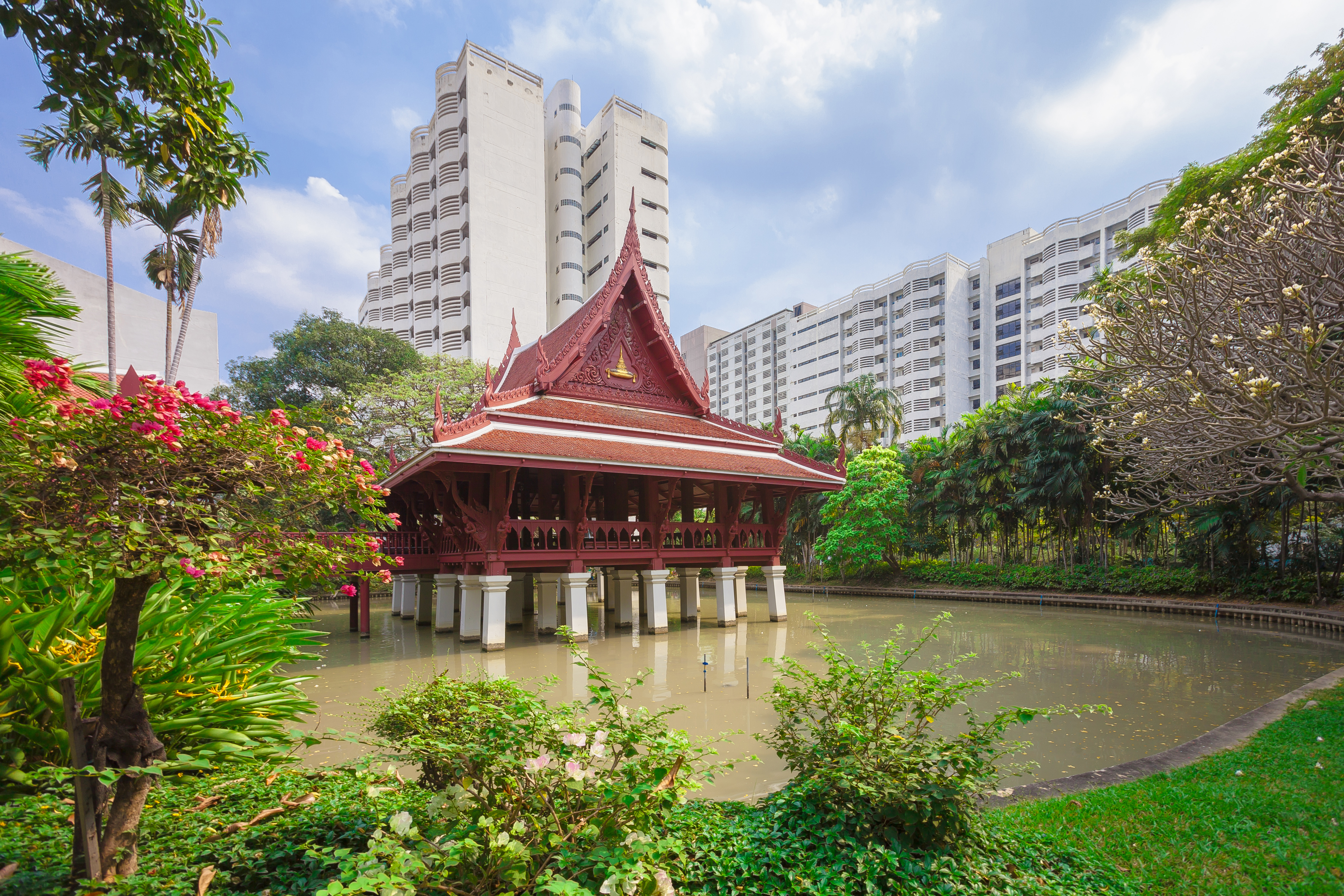
Chulalongkorn Traditional Thai house is a central Thai traditional style house

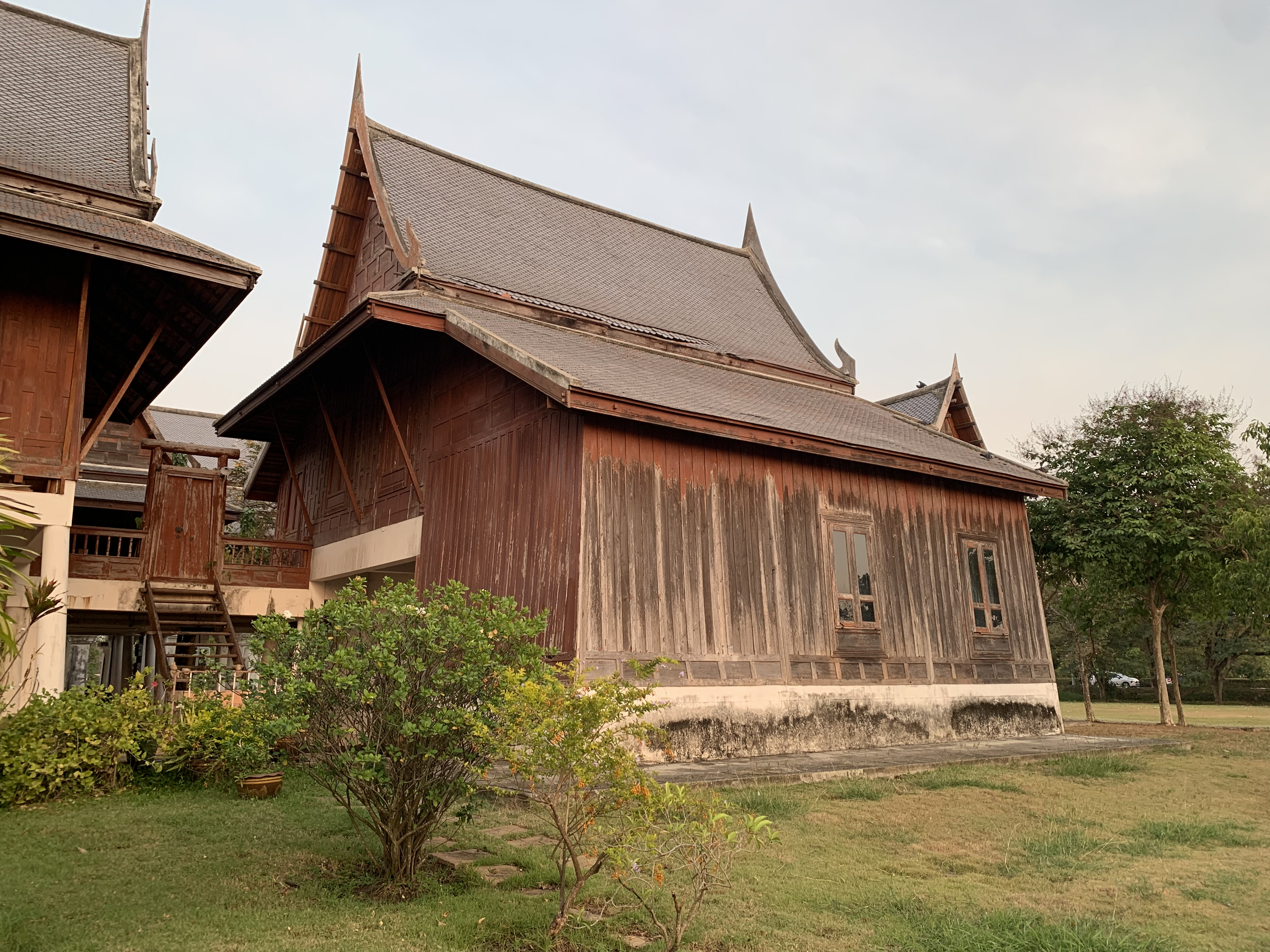
Thai house complex in Srinakharinwirot University, Ongkharak

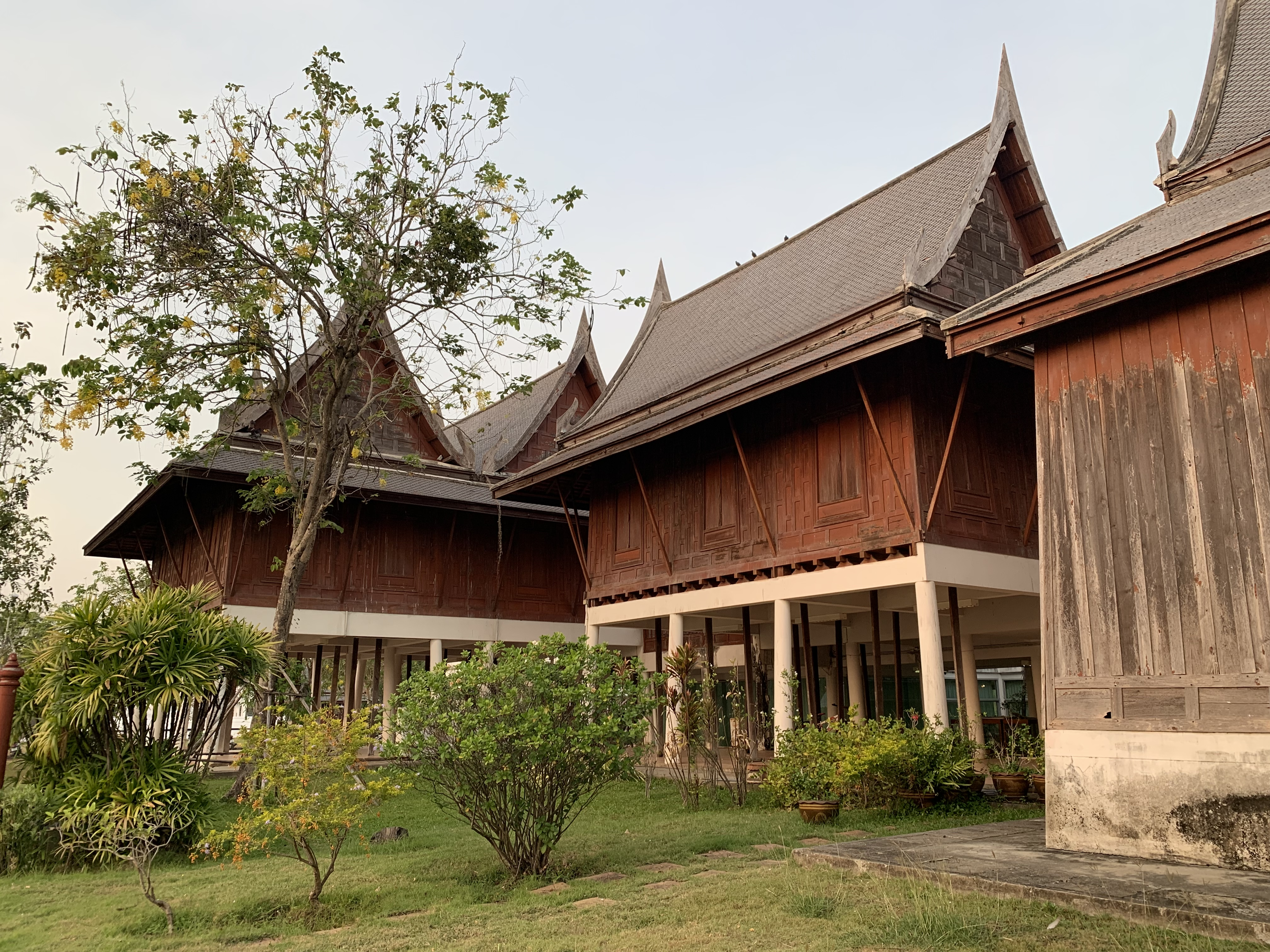
Thai house complex in Srinakharinwirot University, Ongkharak
- Notable contemporary examples:
  - Suan Pakkad Palace
  - M.R. Kukrit Heritage Home
  - Jim Thompson House

=== North-eastern Thai traditional house style ===
The stilt houses in this region were built depending on duration of stay. The first type is a temporary house for farmers, which is built on a platform that was reconstructed from the old wood in harvest season. The durability of this house is only about 2–3 years and is a simple structure that can pulled down easily. The four sides of the walls were open and the walls were roughly built with bamboo. The "semi permanent house" has additional part to a main house building. The additional part has three styles: a style with a roof overlapping a rice storage building, a style which is separated from the main house with all stilts buried into the soil and a style which is built with a middle pole which stops at the beam and is not attached to the soil. The last type is a "permanent house", which has three styles: overlap house, twin style house, and single house. All stilt houses had a few narrow windows and only one door in the front, then the inside was darker than the other stilt houses. There were some similar structures to the stilt houses in the northern region, such as a gabled roof with the sun halo shape and roof tiles made of baked clay.

=== Northern Thai traditional house style ===
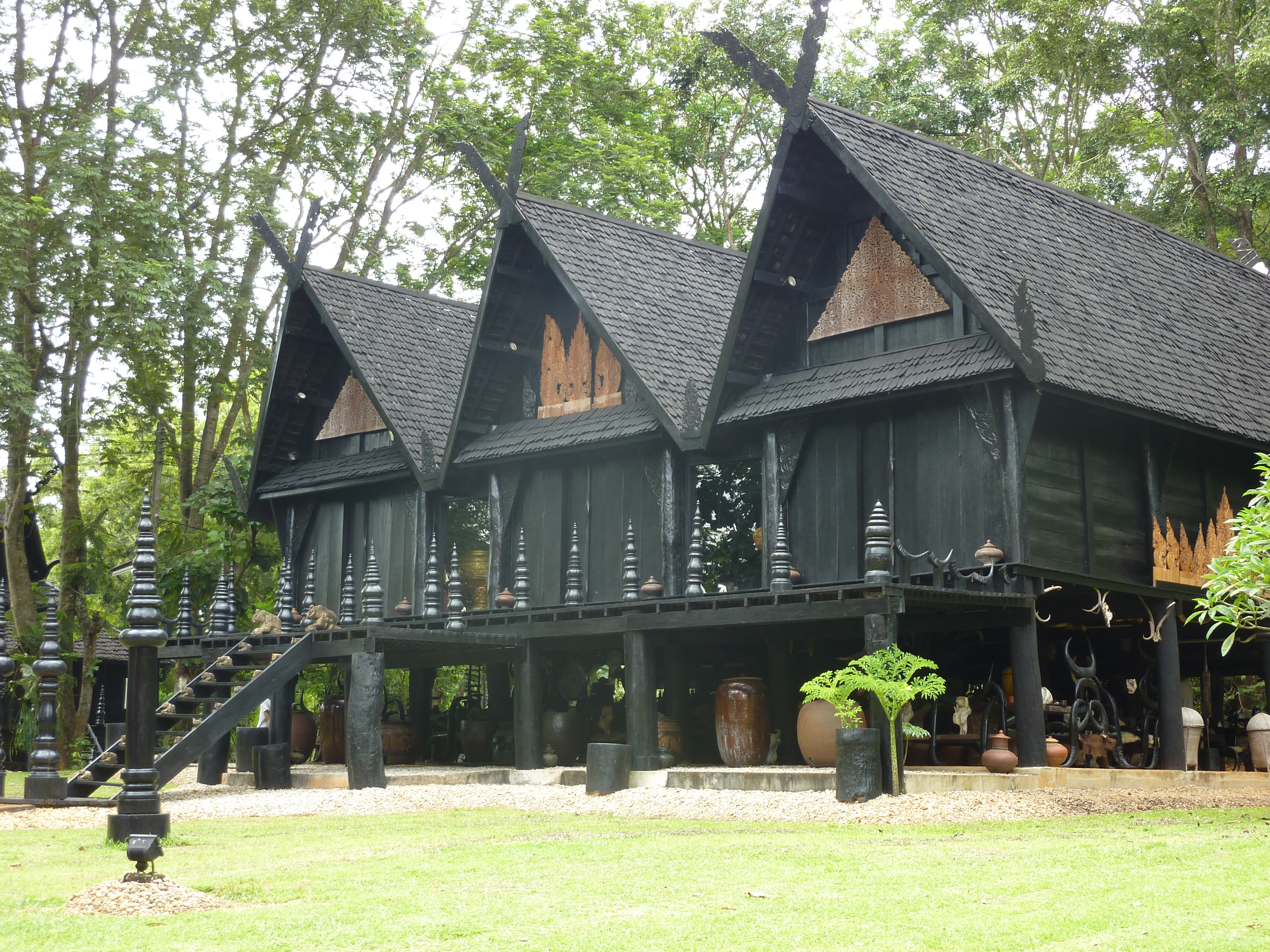
A building group in adapted northern Thai style, at Thawan Duchanee's house in Chiang Rai. Note the kalae roof decorations above the gable.

There are three types of stilt houses in northern Thailand. Firstly, RUEN KHRUNG PHOOK or RUEN MAI BUA (meeting house with rope), which is the oldest type, originated in the countryside. The structures are composed of a roof woven from grasses, floors and walls made with bamboo tied with rope (PHOOK). Poles and beams are the base structure and are made with hard wood. The second type is a “real wood house” and the strongest stilt houses. This type has two styles of roof. KALEA house, an ancient style of LAN-NA people which is decorated by a cross of wood in a V or X shape at the top front. The other roof type is known as “wind spaces house” and the structure was influenced from the central region with a high roof with the halo of the sun in the middle of a gabled roof and the roof tiles are made from baked clay in a fish scale pattern. The last type is a “middle period house” from the period of RAMA 5, and was improved from a basic LAN-NA house, with more complicated layers on the roof and more holes in the walls to make the doors and windows. It is decorated by using stained wood, an influence from western countries that traded with Thailand at that time, such as France or England.

- Notable contemporary examples:
  - Ban Dongphayom

=== Southern Thai traditional house style ===
There are three types of southern stilt houses, RUEN KHRUENG PHOOK (Meeting house with rope), plank house and masonry house. The defining characteristics of the stilt houses of the southern region are the structure of the roof and the stilts on cement poles. The weather of the south of Thailand always rainy with many typhoons, so the house must be stronger than in the other regions. The structure of the southern stilt house is also unique. The walls are made from layers of wood boards, the windows are narrow, using mortise and tension joint instead of the nails, and it has a lower gable roof than other regions. There are three roof styles that were influenced by other countries. Firstly, the gable roof follows the basic style. The tiles are made of grass, baked clay, or rhomboid tiles depend on the status of the owner. The roof will be decorated with carved wood if the owner is of high status. The second style, PANYA or LIMA roof was influenced by Indonesian and Malaysian design. This roof is very strong against storms. The slopes of the roof are trapezoidal. The last type is a Brann’s roof or Manila roof. This roof was integrated from gable roof and PANYA roof. This roof is lower than the other type, the top part is a gable roof and the bottom part is a PANYA roof, the trapezoidal roof supports the top part. Many Muslims in the south of Thailand use Manila roof and the top of the roofs is decorated with a cylinder of carved wood.

== See also ==
- Architecture of Thailand
- Kalae house
