= Tha Kha Floating Market =

Coordinates: 13.471907°N 99.994747°E

Tha Kha Floating Market (Thai: ตลาดน้ำท่าคา, RTGS: Talat Nam Tha Kha, pronounced [tāː.làt nâːm tʰâː kʰāː]) is a floating market in Samut Songkhram Province, Thailand.

Not too far from Damnoen Saduak Floating Market and Amphawa Floating Market, Tha Kha Floating Market still maintains the original concept of market appointment as it is organized only on the 2nd day, the 7th day, and the 12th day of the waning moon from 06.00 hrs. until noon. Most of the items on sale are vegatables, fruits and Thai food.
